= Japan discography =

- Studio albums: 6
- EPs: 8
- Live albums: 1
- Compilation albums: 17
- Singles: 23
- Video albums: 4
- Music videos: 12
- Box sets: 3

The discography of British art pop/new wave band Japan, including their reformation as Rain Tree Crow, consists of six studio albums, seventeen compilation albums, one live album, and four video releases.

== Albums ==
=== Studio albums ===
Title	Details	Peak chart positions							Certifications
Title	Details	UK	AUS	CAN	JPN	NL	NOR	SWE	Certifications
Adolescent Sex	Released: March 1978; Label: Hansa; Formats: LP, MC, 8-track	—	—	—	20	—	—	—	
Obscure Alternatives	Released: 27 October 1978; Label: Hansa; Formats: LP, MC, 8-track	—	—	—	21	41	—	—	
Quiet Life	Released: 7 December 1979; Label: Hansa; Formats: LP, MC, 8-track	13 (Note: Quiet Life peaked at number 72 in February 1980. It was reissued in January 1982, peaking at number 53. Upon re-release in March 2021, it peaked at number 13.)	—	81	24	—	—	—	BPI: Gold
Gentlemen Take Polaroids	Released: 7 November 1980; Label: Virgin; Formats: LP, MC	51	86	39	51	—	—	—	BPI: Gold
Tin Drum	Released: 13 November 1981; Label: Virgin; Formats: LP, MC	12	—	—	38	—	16	33	BPI: Gold
Rain Tree Crow (Japan reformed as "Rain Tree Crow")	Released: 8 April 1991; Label: Virgin; Formats: CD, LP, MC	24	—	72	49	61	—	33	
"—" denotes releases that did not chart or were not released in that territory.

=== Live albums ===
Title	Details	Peak chart positions						Certifications
Title	Details	UK	CAN	JPN	NL	NZ	SWE	Certifications
Oil on Canvas	Released: 10 June 1983; Label: Virgin; Formats: 2xLP, MC	5	91	11	29	20	35	BPI: Gold

=== Compilation albums ===
Title	Details	Peak chart positions			Certifications
Title	Details	UK	JPN	US	Certifications
The Singles – The Best	Released: 21 March 1981; Label: Hansa; Formats: MC; Japan-only release	—	—	—	
Assemblage	Released: 11 September 1981; Label: Hansa; Formats: LP, MC	26	45	—	BPI: Gold
Japan	Released: 1 March 1982; Label: Epic; Formats: LP, MC; US-only release	—	—	204	
Exorcising Ghosts	Released: 26 November 1984; Label: Virgin; Formats: CD, 2xLP, MC	45	—	—	BPI: Gold
Souvenir from Japan	Released: 23 October 1989; Label: Hansa; Formats: CD, MC	—	—	—	
The Other Side of Japan	Released: 1991; Label: Receiver; Formats: CD, LP	—	—	—	
Best Selection	Released: 6 July 1994; Label: Hansa, BMG Victor; Formats: CD; Japan-only release	—	—	—	
In Vogue	Released: 24 August 1996; Label: Camden, BMG; Formats: CD	—	—	—	
Japan Is the Masterpiece, but New Too	Released: 4 September 1996; Label: Hansa, BMG Victor; Japanese-only promo release	—	—	—	
The Singles	Released: 4 September 1996; Label: Hansa, BMG Victor; Formats: 2xCD; Japanese-only release	—	—	—	
The Masters	Released: September 1997; Label: Eagle; Formats: CD	—	—	—	
The Best of Japan (Eternal Best)	Released: 21 November 1998; Label: Ariola, BMG; Formats: CD; Japan-only release	—	—	—	
The Collection	Released: 6 November 2000; Label: Armoury; Formats: CD	—	—	—	
The Best of Japan – Original Hits	Released: 2001; Label: Paradiso; Formats: CD; Belgium-only remastered re-release of Assemblage	—	—	—	
The Best of Japan	Released: 2 October 2002; Label: Ariola, BMG; Formats: CD; Japan-only release	—	—	—	
The Very Best of Japan	Released: 27 March 2006; Label: Virgin/EMI; Formats: CD	—	—	—	
The Collection	Released: 27 July 2009; Label: Camden, Sony Music; Formats: CD, digital download	—	—	—	
"—" denotes releases that did not chart or were not released in that territory.

=== Box sets ===
Title	Details	Peak chart positions
Title	Details	JPN
Japan Collector's Edition	Released: October 1990; Label: Virgin; Formats: 3xCD; Limited edition; Includes Gentlemen Take Polaroids, Tin Drum and Oil on Canvas	—
Prophétique 1978 ~ 1980	Released: 4 August 1993; Label: Hansa; Formats: 4xCD; Japan-only release; Includes Adolescent Sex, Obscure Alternatives, Quiet Life and an EP bonus disc	86
Original Album Classics	Released: 28 March 2011; Label: Sony Music; Formats: 3xCD; Includes Adolescent Sex, Obscure Alternatives (with bonus tracks) and Quiet Life (with bonus tracks)	—
"—" denotes releases that did not chart or were not released in that territory.

==== Repackaged sets ====
Title	Details
Take Two: Adolescent Sex & Obscure Alternatives	Released: 1 August 1983; Label: Hansa, Arista; Formats: MC
Quiet Life / Assemblage	Released: 1995; Label: Arista, BMG; Formats: 2xCD
Gentlemen Take Polaroids / Tin Drum	Released: 21 October 2002; Label: Virgin; Formats: 2xCD; Limited edition
Gentlemen Take Polaroids / Oil on Canvas	Released: 27 June 2011; Label: Virgin/EMI; Formats: 2xCD

== EPs and mini-albums ==
Title	Details	Peak chart positions
Title	Details	JPN
Special Edition Five Song Extended Play	Released: 1980; Label: Hansa; Formats: 12"; Canada-only release	—
Live in Japan	Released: July 1980; Label: Hansa; Formats: 12"; Live EP	—
Gentlemen Take Polaroids	Released: October 1980; Label: Virgin; Formats: 2x7"	—
The Singles	Released: 21 March 1981; Label: Hansa; Formats: 12" mini-album; Japan-only release	36
The Art of Parties	Released: 29 April 1981; Label: Virgin; Formats: 12"; Canada-only release	—
Nightporter	Released: 5 December 1982; Label: Virgin; Formats: 12"; Japan-only release	35
The Art of Parties	Released: 15 September 2003; Label: Virgin; Formats: CD; Different from 1981 EP	—
Introducing... Japan	Released: 20 May 2008; Label: Virgin; Formats: digital download; Only available from the UK iTunes Store	—
"—" denotes releases that did not chart or were not released in that territory.

== Singles ==
Single	Year	Peak chart positions					Album
Single	Year	UK	BE	IRE	JPN	NL	Album
"Don't Rain on My Parade"	1978	—	—	—	—	—	Adolescent Sex
"Adolescent Sex" (Note: released in EU and Australia)	1978	—	28	—	—	21	Adolescent Sex
"The Unconventional"	1978	—	—	—	—	—	Adolescent Sex
"Sometimes I Feel So Low"	1978	—	—	—	—	—	Obscure Alternatives
"Deviation" (Note: released in The Netherlands)	1979	—	—	—	—	—	Obscure Alternatives
"Life in Tokyo"	1979	—	—	—	—	—	Non-album single
"Quiet Life" (Note: released in Japan, Netherlands and Germany)	1979	—	—	—	—	—	Quiet Life
"I Second That Emotion"	1980	—	—	—	87	—	Non-album single
"Gentlemen Take Polaroids"	1980	60	—	—	—	—	Gentlemen Take Polaroids
"The Art of Parties"	1981	48	—	—	—	—	Tin Drum
"Life in Tokyo"	1981	—	—	—	—	—	Assemblage
"Quiet Life"	1981	19	—	—	—	—	Assemblage
"Visions of China"	1981	32	—	—	—	—	Tin Drum
"European Son" (Steve Nye Remix)	1982	31	—	—	—	—	Assemblage
"Ghosts"	1982	5	—	19	—	—	Tin Drum
"Cantonese Boy"	1982	24	—	20	—	—	Tin Drum
"I Second That Emotion" (Steve Nye Remix)	1982	9	—	14	—	—	Assemblage
"Life in Tokyo" (Steve Nye Remix)	1982	28	—	26	—	—	Assemblage
"Nightporter" (Steve Nye Remix)	1982	29	—	13	—	—	Gentlemen Take Polaroids
"All Tomorrow's Parties" (Steve Nye Remix)	1983	38	—	—	—	—	Assemblage
"Canton" (Live)	1983	42	—	—	—	—	Oil on Canvas
"Blackwater" (Note: as Rain Tree Crow)	1991	62	—	—	—	—	Rain Tree Crow
"—" denotes releases that did not chart or were not released in that territory.

== Videos ==
=== Video albums ===
Title	Details
Oil on Canvas	Released: March 1983; Label: Virgin Video; Formats: VHS, VHD, Betamax, LaserDisc; Live material filmed at the Hammersmith Odeon in November 1982
Instant Pictures	Released: October 1984; Label: Virgin Video; Formats: VHS, VHD, Betamax, LaserDisc; Promo videos and alternate versions of live tracks
Video Hits	Released: 24 July 2001; Label: Hansa, BMG; Formats: DVD; Japan-only release
The Very Best of Japan	Released: 27 March 2006; Label: Virgin; Formats: DVD; Includes the Oil on Canvas concert and a collection of promo videos

=== Music videos ===
Title	Year
"Don't Rain on My Parade"	1978
"Sometimes I Feel So Low"	1978
"Communist China"	1978
"Adolescent Sex"	1978
"Life in Tokyo"	1979
"Quiet Life"	1980
"I Second That Emotion"	1980
"Gentlemen Take Polaroids"	1980
"Swing"	1980
"Visions of China"	1981
"Ghosts"	1982
"Nightporter"	1982

== See also ==
- David Sylvian discography
