= The Very Best of Japan =

Greatest hits album by Japan
- Released: 28 March 2006
- Genre: Art pop; new wave; synthpop
- Length: 72:39
- Label: Virgin/EMI

Japan chronology
Exorcising Ghosts (1984)	The Very Best of Japan (2006)	The Collection (2009)

Professional ratings
Review scores
Source	Rating
Encyclopedia of Popular Music	4/5 stars
MusicOMH	5/5 stars

The Very Best of Japan is a compilation album by the British band Japan, released worldwide in 2006 by EMI Music.

Although not the first Japan compilation to collect recordings from the band's career on both Hansa Records and Virgin Records, it is certainly the most comprehensive and includes all nine of their UK top 40 hit singles as well as two other singles that made the top 50, released between the years 1981 and 1983; "The Art of Parties" (#48, 1981), "Quiet Life"(#19, 1981), "Visions of China" (#32, 1981), "European Son (Remix)" (#31, 1981), "Ghosts" (#5, 1982), "Cantonese Boy" (#24, 1982), "I Second That Emotion (Remix)" (#9, 1982), "Life in Tokyo (Remix)" (#28, 1982), "Nightporter (Remix)" (#29, 1982), "All Tomorrow's Parties (Remix)" (#38, 1983) and "Canton" (Live) (#42, 1983).

The Very Best of Japan includes both the single and album versions of their biggest commercial hit "Ghosts", the 12" mix of "The Art of Parties" as well as the Steve Nye remix of "Taking Islands in Africa", originally released as the B-side of the "Visions of China" 7" single in 1981.

The album was accompanied by a DVD release, which includes seven promo videos as well as the Oil on Canvas concert recorded in 1982.

== Track listing ==
All tracks written by David Sylvian unless otherwise noted.

1. "Ghosts" (Single Version) - 3:59
2. "I Second That Emotion" (Single Mix) (Cleveland, Robinson) - 3:47
3. "Quiet Life" (7" Version) - 3:54
4. "Gentlemen Take Polaroids" - 7:08
5. "The Art of Parties" (Single Version) - 6:46
6. "Visions of China" (Jansen, Sylvian) - 3:41
7. "Taking Islands in Africa" (Steve Nye Remix) (Sakamoto, Sylvian) - 4:57
8. "European Son" (Single Mix) - 3:40
9. "Cantonese Boy" - 3:49
10. "Life in Tokyo" - Part 1 (Special Remix) (Moroder, Sylvian) - 4:03
11. "Nightporter" - 7:01
12. "Methods of Dance" - 6:57
13. "All Tomorrow's Parties" (7" Version) (Reed) - 3:35
14. "Canton" (Live) (Jansen, Sylvian) - 5:30
15. "Ghosts" (Album Version) - 4:39

Notes

- The original album version of "Ghosts" is available on the album Tin Drum.
- "I Second That Emotion" was first released in the UK on the compilation album Assemblage.
- The original version of "Quiet Life" is available on the album Quiet Life.
- "Gentlemen Take Polaroids is taken from the album Gentlemen Take Polaroids.
- "The Art of Parties" is mistitled. The version included here is the extended 12" single version. The original version was released as a single only 7"/12". A rerecorded version is available on the album Tin Drum.
- "Visions of China" is taken from the album Tin Drum.
- The original version of "Taking Islands in Africa" is available on the album Gentlemen Take Polaroids.
- This version of "European Son" was first released in the UK on the album Assemblage.
- "Cantonese Boy" is taken from the album Tin Drum.
- This version of "Life in Tokyo" was first released in the UK on the album Assemblage.
- "Nightporter" and "Methods of Dance" are taken from the album Gentlemen Take Polaroids.
- The original version of "All Tomorrow's Parties" is available on the album Quiet Life.
- "Canton" (Live) is taken from the album Oil on Canvas. The original studio version is available on the album Tin Drum.

== DVD ==
Promo videos:

1. "Life In Tokyo"
2. "Quiet Life"
3. "I Second That Emotion"
4. "Gentlemen Take Polaroids"
5. "Swing"
6. "Visions Of China"
7. "Nightporter"

Oil on Canvas - live at the Hammersmith Odeon 1982:

8. Overture ("Burning Bridges")
9. "Sons Of Pioneers"
10. "Gentlemen Take Polaroids"
11. "Swing"
12. "Cantonese Boy"
13. "Visions Of China"
14. "Canton"
15. "Ghosts"
16. "Methods Of Dance"
17. "Still Life In Mobile Homes"
18. "The Art Of Parties"
19. "Voices Raised In Welcome, Hands Held In Prayer"
