= Exorcising Ghosts =

Compilation album by Japan
- Released: 26 November 1984
- Recorded: 1979–1983
- Length: 86:27 (LP); 61:09 (CD)
- Label: Virgin
- Producers: Richard Barbieri; Steve Jansen; Mick Karn; Steve Nye; John Punter; David Sylvian

Japan chronology
Assemblage (1981)	Exorcising Ghosts (1984)	The Very Best of Japan (2006)

Singles from Exorcising Ghosts
- 1. "Visions of China" Released: 10 December 1984

Professional ratings
Review scores
Source	Rating
AllMusic	4/5 stars
Encyclopedia of Popular Music	3/5 stars

Exorcising Ghosts is a compilation album by the British band Japan, released in November 1984 by record label Virgin.

== Content ==
Exorcising Ghosts was compiled and produced in consultation with lead singer David Sylvian two years after Japan dissolved. It features three recordings from the band's early career on the Hansa Records label (all from 1979's Quiet Life) but mainly focuses on material from their two studio albums on Virgin Records; Gentlemen Take Polaroids (1980) and Tin Drum (1981).

Besides top 40 hit singles like "Quiet Life", "Visions of China", "Ghosts", and "Nightporter", the double-album set includes album tracks like "Methods of Dance", "Talking Drum" and "Swing" alongside a selection of rarities such as the single B-sides "A Foreign Place" and "Life Without Buildings", the 1981 remix of "Taking Islands in Africa", the instrumental studio recording "Voices Raised in Welcome, Hands Held in Prayer" included on 1983's live album Oil on Canvas and the 12" mix of "The Art of Parties".

As to fit the album onto a single disc, the original CD release omitted five of the sixteen tracks; "Swing", "A Foreign Place", "Taking Islands in Africa", "Sons of Pioneers" and "Voices Raised in Welcome, Hands Held in Prayer".

== Cover ==
The cover art is by Russell Mills, "A dark and expressive piece, recalling the rusty hues of the work of Frank "Head of Jym III" Auerbach and that so impressed Sylvian", according to his biographer Martin Power, that the musician bought the original painting. This marked the beginning of a long collaboration between the two artists.

== Release ==
Exorcising Ghosts reached No. 45 in the UK Albums Chart and was certified Gold (100,000 copies) by the BPI in February 1997.

== Track listing ==
All tracks are written by David Sylvian, except where noted.

Side one
No.	Title	From the album	Length
1.	"Methods of Dance"	Gentlemen Take Polaroids	6:46
2.	"Swing"	Gentlemen Take Polaroids	6:20
3.	"Gentlemen Take Polaroids"	Gentlemen Take Polaroids	7:04
4.	"Quiet Life"	Quiet Life	4:47
Total length:			24:57

Side two
No.	Title	Writer(s)	From the album	Length
5.	"A Foreign Place"	Sylvian, Richard Barbieri	1981 B-side of the single "Quiet Life"	3:11
6.	"Nightporter"		Gentlemen Take Polaroids	6:49
7.	"My New Career"		Gentlemen Take Polaroids	3:50
8.	"The Other Side of Life"		Quiet Life	7:22
Total length:				21:12 (46:09)

Side three
No.	Title	Writer(s)	From the album	Length
9.	"Visions of China"	Sylvian, Steve Jansen	Tin Drum	3:38
10.	"Taking Islands in Africa" (Steve Nye Remix)	Sylvian, Ryuichi Sakamoto	Original version appears on Gentlemen Take Polaroids	4:55
11.	"Ghosts"		Tin Drum	4:30
12.	"Sons of Pioneers"	Sylvian, Mick Karn	Tin Drum	7:08
Total length:				20:11

Side four
No.	Title	Writer(s)	From the album	Length
13.	"Voices Raised in Welcome, Hands Held in Prayer"	Sylvian, Jansen	Oil on Canvas	3:21
14.	"Life Without Buildings"		B-side of the 12" single "The Art of Parties"	6:34
15.	"Talking Drum" (Edited intro)		Tin Drum	3:31
16.	"The Art of Parties" (12" Version)		Alternative version appears on Tin Drum	6:41
Total length:				20:07 (40:18) (86:27)

=== CD release (1984) ===
No.	Title	Length
1.	"Methods of Dance"	6:50
2.	"Gentlemen Take Polaroids"	7:04
3.	"Quiet Life"	4:52
4.	"Nightporter"	6:48
5.	"My New Career"	3:52
6.	"The Other Side of Life"	7:25
7.	"Visions of China"	3:38
8.	"Ghosts"	4:32
9.	"Life Without Buildings"	6:35
10.	"Talking Drum" (Edited intro)	3:32
11.	"The Art of Parties" (12" Version)	6:46
Total length:		61:09

== Reception ==
A review at All Music wrote, "It's not a true career overview, and given that the band only released two albums during its stint on Virgin, a collection that includes at least half of each of those efforts is ultimately a strange exercise in superfluity. That all said, though, if one needs to have a useful enough starting point for what made Japan so great, Exorcising Ghosts is a reasonable way to start."
