= Nightporter =

1982 single by Japan

- 7-inch single cover

Single by Japan
- B-side: "Ain't That Peculiar" (7"); "Methods of Dance" (12")
- Released: 12 November 1982
- Recorded: August – September 1980
- Studio: AIR (London, UK)
- Genre: New wave; synthpop
- Length: 5:01 (7"); 6:48 (12"); 6:57 (original Gentlemen Take Polaroids album version)
- Label: Virgin
- Songwriter: David Sylvian
- Producer: John Punter

Japan singles chronology
"Life in Tokyo" (1982)	"Nightporter" (1982)	"All Tomorrow's Parties" (1983)

"Nightporter" is a song by English new wave band Japan. The song originally featured on the band's fourth album Gentlemen Take Polaroids in 1980. However, it was then remixed by Steve Nye and released as a single in November 1982. The single peaked at number 29 on the UK Singles Chart.

== Inspiration ==
The title of the song takes its inspiration from the 1974 film The Night Porter. This influence can also be seen on the Gentlemen Take Polaroids album cover, with its inspiration taken from the character played by Dirk Bogarde in the film. "Nightporter" is also influenced by French composer Erik Satie, specifically his piano compositions Gymnopédies, with David Sylvian stating "I was influenced an awful lot by Satie, but I've milked him dry after 'Nightporter'". The song has also been described as "a direct descendant of Obscure Alternatives' "The Tenant" and Quiet Life's "Despair"".

== Lyrics, music and recording ==
The song "marked the first real example of Sylvian using first person narrative to convey a sense of longing and regret to his audience". The song is a ballad, with a "rather minimalistic arrangement [that] is dominated by piano". AllMusic reviewer Ned Raggett describes the song as "a slow-paced semi-waltz with Barbieri's piano taking the lead throughout with wonderful results". The piano part was actually played by both Barbieri and Sylvian in tandem, with the former stating that "I think it was just a case of one of us playing the chordal and bass parts and the other playing the top lines".

Sylvian's vocals and the piano are accompanied by a string bass and an oboe, both of which were played by session musicians Barry Guy and Andrew Cauthery, respectively, with a keyboard coming in towards the end, also by Barbieri. Guy has since said that he "remember[s] nothing about the session, other than they had great barnets".

== Release ==
The single was released in November 1982, a month before the band split. Originally Virgin Records had planned to release the unreleased song "Some Kind of Fool" from the Gentlemen Take Polaroids recording sessions as a single, but it was replaced by "Nightporter". The 7-inch single has a cover of "Ain't That Peculiar" as its B-side, which also originally featured on Gentlemen Take Polaroids. However, this version of the song is an alternate version that first appeared on the 1980 various artists compilation album Cash Cows. A 7-inch promo single 'DJ Edit' of "Nightporter" was also released and it was used for the soundtrack to the music video. The 12-inch single features a different B-side, "Methods of Dance", which was taken from Gentlemen Take Polaroids. A six-song EP was also released, only in Japan, in December 1982.

== Reception ==
John Shearlaw was disparaging in his review for Record Mirror, writing that "David Sylvian reaches out for the ultimate concept with a desperately dreary remix of a 'stage favourite' from the 'Gentlemen Take Polaroids' album. Watch the tinkling piano and whining voice climb up the charts... and cry". However, in Melody Maker, Paul Simper was more positive, describing "Nightporter" as "an arresting and unexpected single in the wake of their Tin Drum LP. Shaped round some elegant piano and with Dave Sylvian’s vocals returning to the impressive emotional depths of “Ghosts”, this should give the band’s critics a little food for thought".

== Track listings ==
7": Virgin / VS 554 (UK)

1. "Nightporter" (1982 Remix) – 5:01
2. "Ain't That Peculiar" – 4:49

7": Virgin / VDJ 554 (UK, Promo)

1. "Nightporter" – 3:35
2. "Ain't That Peculiar" – 4:49

12": Virgin / VS 554-12 (UK)

1. "Nightporter" (1982 Extended Remix) – 6:48
2. "Methods of Dance" – 6:53

EP: Virgin / VIP-4181 (Japan)

1. "Nightporter" (Remix) – 5:02
2. "Ghosts" – 3:52
3. "The Art of Parties" (Version) – 5:33
4. "The Experience of Swimming" – 4:02
5. "Life Without Buildings" – 6:39
6. "The Width of a Room" – 3:14

== Personnel ==
On "Nightporter":

- David Sylvian – vocals, piano
- Richard Barbieri – keyboards, piano
- Andrew Cauthery – oboe
- Barry Guy – string bass
- Mick Karn, Ann Odell – string bass and oboe arrangement

On "Ain't That Peculiar":

- David Sylvian – vocals, keyboards
- Richard Barbieri – keyboards
- Mick Karn – fretless bass, recorder
- Steve Jansen – drums, African drums, keyboards
- Rob Dean – guitar, E-bow

On "Methods of Dance":

- David Sylvian – vocals, keyboards
- Richard Barbieri – keyboards
- Mick Karn – fretless bass, saxophone
- Steve Jansen – drums, percussion, keyboard percussion
- Rob Dean – guitar
- Cyo – backing vocals

Technical

- David Sylvian – cover concept
- Yuka Fujii – cover photography
- Ken Ansell – hand lettering

== Charts ==
Chart (1982)	Peak position
Ireland (IRMA)	13
UK Singles (OCC)	29
