= All Tomorrow's Parties =

1966 single by The Velvet Underground and Nico

- Promotional picture sleeve

Single by the Velvet Underground and Nico

from the album The Velvet Underground & Nico
- B-side: "I'll Be Your Mirror"
- Released: July 1966
- Recorded: April 1966
- Studio: Scepter, New York City
- Genre: Avant garde; pop; psychedelic rock
- Length: 5:55 (album version); 2:55 (single version)
- Label: Verve
- Songwriter: Lou Reed
- Producer: Andy Warhol

The Velvet Underground and Nico singles chronology
"All Tomorrow's Parties" / "I'll Be Your Mirror" (1966)	"Sunday Morning" / "Femme Fatale" (1966)

Audio sample
- Beginning of 3rd verse, with Nico's double-tracked lead vocals: file; help

"All Tomorrow's Parties" is a song by the Velvet Underground and Nico, written by Lou Reed and released as the band's debut single in 1966. The song is from their 1967 debut studio album, The Velvet Underground & Nico.

Inspiration for the song came from Reed's observation of Andy Warhol's clique—according to Reed, the song is "a very apt description of certain people at the Factory at the time. ... I watched Andy. I watched Andy watching everybody. I would hear people say the most astonishing things, the craziest things, the funniest things, the saddest things." In a 2006 interview, Reed's VU bandmate John Cale stated: "The song was about a girl called Darryl, a beautiful petite blonde with three kids, two of whom were taken away from her." The song was Andy Warhol's favorite by The Velvet Underground. The song was described as "avant-garde in the extreme" and as "one of the first pop songs to use prepared piano".

The song has notably lent its name to a music festival, a novel by William Gibson, and a film by Yu Lik-wai.

== Recording ==
The song was recorded at Scepter Studios in Manhattan during April 1966. It features a piano motif played by Cale (initially written as an exercise) based largely on tone clusters. The repetitive keyboard part was inspired by the style of Cale's musician friend Terry Riley, with whom Cale had played in La Monte Young's mid-1960s group Theatre of Eternal Music. It was one of the first pop songs to make use of prepared piano (a chain of paper clips were intertwined with the piano strings to change their sounds). The song also features the ostrich guitar tuning by Reed, by which all of the guitar strings were tuned to D. Drummer Maureen Tucker plays tambourine and bass drum while guitarist Sterling Morrison plays bass, an instrument that he professed to hate, despite his proficiency as a bassist.

Nico provides lead vocals. The song was originally recorded with only one track of her vocals; they were later double-tracked for the final album version. Most versions of the album use this version of the song, though the initial 1987 CD release uses the original mix without the double-tracking.

== Personnel ==
- Nico – lead vocals
- Lou Reed – fretless ostrich electric guitar
- John Cale – prepared piano, viola
- Sterling Morrison – bass
- Maureen Tucker – bass drum, tambourine

== Alternate versions ==
=== Ludlow Street Loft, July 1965 ===
The earliest known recorded version of "All Tomorrow's Parties" was recorded on reel to reel tape by Lou Reed, John Cale and Sterling Morrison in a New York apartment loft on Ludlow Street. With Reed on acoustic guitar, the song displays a strong influence from the American folk music revival—particularly in Cale and Morrison's harmony vocals—which critic David Fricke suggests demonstrates Reed's fondness for Bob Dylan. This version, released on the Peel Slowly and See box set, is composed of multiple takes, which add up to a time of 18:26.

=== Single version, July 1966 ===
An edited version of the song was released in July 1966 as a single with "I'll Be Your Mirror" as a B-side. The song cuts out about half of the studio version at just under three minutes. It did not chart.

This version later became available in 1995 on the Peel Slowly and See boxset and appeared on the "Deluxe Edition" of The Velvet Underground & Nico released in 2002.

=== Other alternate versions ===
An anniversary reissue of the album included an "alternate single voice version" and an "alternate instrumental mix."

== Japan version ==
"All Tomorrow's Parties"

Single by Japan

from the album Quiet Life
- B-side: "In Vogue" (Live in Tokyo) (7")
- Released: 27 February 1983
- Recorded: June 1979
- Studio: DJM Studios, London
- Genre: Soft rock; art rock
- Length: 5:43 (album version); 3:32 (remix version)
- Label: Hansa
- Songwriter: Lou Reed
- Producers: Simon Napier-Bell; Japan

Japan singles chronology
"Nightporter" (1982)	"All Tomorrow's Parties" (1983)	"Canton" (1983)

English new wave band Japan originally covered the song on their 1979 album Quiet Life. However, several months after the band split, a version of the song, remixed in 1981 by Steve Nye, was released as a single in February 1983. The song peaked at number 38 on the UK Singles Chart.

=== Releases ===
The 7-inch single was released with the B-side "In Vogue", which was originally featured on the Quiet Life album. However, this version is a live version from Tokyo in March 1980, with the single stating that it was taken from the 1982 'Assemblage Special Edition Cassette' (however, it was originally released on the Live in Tokyo EP in 1980). The 12-inch single features two B-side tracks, also live versions from Tokyo: "Deviation" and "Obscure Alternatives", both of which originally featured on the band's second album Obscure Alternatives. A limited edition bonus 12-inch single "European Son" was also released.

A total of 4 differently labelled 12-inch singles were released and along with the 7-inch single, none of them correctly credited the producers as Simon Napier Bell and Japan. The 7-inch single and 3 versions of the 12-inch single credited Giorgio Moroder as the producer, whilst the other 12-inch single credited the producer as John Punter.

=== Track listings ===
7": Hansa / HANSA 18 (UK)

1. "All Tomorrow's Parties" (1983 Remix) – 3:32
2. "In Vogue" (Live in Tokyo) – 6:10

12": Hansa / HANSA 1218 (UK)

1. "All Tomorrow's Parties" (1983 Extended Remix) – 5:15
2. "Deviation" (Live in Tokyo) – 3:18
3. "Obscure Alternatives" (Live in Tokyo) – 6:04

Double 12": Hansa / HANSA 1218 (UK, Limited Edition)

1. "All Tomorrow's Parties" (1983 Extended Remix) – 5:15
2. "Deviation" (Live in Tokyo) – 3:18
3. "Obscure Alternatives" (Live in Tokyo) – 6:04
4. "European Son" (Extended Remix) – 5:33
5. "Alien" – 4:59

=== Personnel ===
Japan

- David Sylvian – vocals
- Rob Dean – guitar
- Richard Barbieri – synthesizers
- Mick Karn – bass guitar, saxophone, backing vocals
- Steve Jansen – drums

Technical

- Keith Bessey – engineering
- Steve Nye – remixing
- David Shortt – design
- Fin Costello – photography

=== Charts ===
Chart (1983)	Peak position
UK Singles (OCC)	38
