= Assemblage (album) =

Compilation album by Japan
- Released: 11 September 1981
- Recorded: 1977–1980
- Genres: Glam rock; new wave; art pop; synth-pop
- Length: 43:42
- Labels: Hansa; BMG-Ariola; Sony BMG
- Producers: Ray Singer; Giorgio Moroder; Simon Napier-Bell; Japan; John Punter

Japan chronology
| Gentlemen Take Polaroids (1980) | Assemblage (1981) | Tin Drum (1981) |

Singles from Assemblage
- 1. "Life in Tokyo" Released: 27 April 1981; 2. "Quiet Life" Released: 21 August 1981; 3. "European Son" Released: 8 January 1982; 4. "I Second That Emotion" Released: June 1982; 5. "Life in Tokyo" Released: 27 September 1982; 6. "All Tomorrow's Parties" Released: February 1983

Professional ratings
Review scores
| Source | Rating |
|---|---|
| AllMusic | 2.5/5 stars |
| Encyclopedia of Popular Music | 3/5 stars |

Assemblage is a compilation album by the British band Japan, released in September 1981 by Hansa Records.

== Release ==
Upon release in September 1981, the album spent 10 weeks in the UK Albums Chart, peaking at number 32. The album then re-entered the chart in the second week of January 1982 spent intermittently a further 36 weeks in the chart, peaking at number 26 in August 1982, and its final week being the third week of April 1983. The album spent so long in the charts because of the number of singles from the album that were released by Hansa between 1981 and 1983. The album was also re-released on cassette with bonus tracks in October 1982 with the additional title 'Special Edition Double Play'. These bonus tracks served as the track listing of the album when released in Japan in January 1983. Assemblage was certified Gold by the BPI in January 1983.

Assemblage was one of the first of numerous Japan compilations issued by Hansa/BMG Ariola/Sony BMG, but remains the only one originally released in consultation with the band members themselves.

Assemblage was reissued on CD by Sony BMG Music Entertainment in 2004, then including four bonus tracks as well as two videos. Initial pressings of this reissue accidentally omit the first bass note of "Adolescent Sex" and include an incorrect bonus version of "Life in Tokyo." Subsequent pressings correct these errors.

== Singles ==
The first single that could be classed as being from Assemblage is "Life in Tokyo", released in April 1981. It had originally been released in 1979 but was reissued in 1981 due to popular demand. It was then remixed by Tin Drum producer Steve Nye and a new bass was overdubbed by Mick Karn and was released as a single for the third time in September 1982 (known as the 'Special Remix') and peaked at number 28 in the UK Singles Chart. There was also a second remix in late 1982 with synths/drum machine overdubs, which has appeared on various subsequent Hansa/Ariola compilations.

The next single, "Quiet Life" was released in August 1981 and it states on the sleeve that is from Assemblage. It was first released in Japan in December 1979 with a duration of 4:14. It then appeared on the Quiet Life album (duration 4:53) and was released in 1980 as an A-side single in Germany and the Netherlands and B-side single in the UK (both a fade-out version with a duration of 3:53). The 1981 release is an edited version with a duration of 3:34, and it peaked at number 19 in the UK.

The third single, "European Son" was released in January 1982. It was originally recorded and produced by Simon Napier-Bell and Japan in 1979 and was remixed by Quiet Life producer John Punter before release. It was first released as a single in Japan in March 1980 and was first released in the UK in 1981 as the B-side to "Life in Tokyo". The 1982 release is a remix by Steve Nye with new bass overdubbed by Mick Karn, and it peaked at number 31 in the UK.

The fourth single was a cover of Smokey Robinson & the Miracles' "I Second That Emotion", released in June 1982. It was originally released in March 1980 with the B-side "Quiet Life" in the UK and "European Son" in Japan. The 1982 release is a Steve Nye remix and it became the band's second biggest hit, reaching number 9 in the UK.

"Life in Tokyo" was then re-released as mentioned above as the fifth single. The sixth and final single was a cover of The Velvet Underground and Nico's "All Tomorrow's Parties", released in February 1983. The original version was included on Quiet Life and the 1983 release is a remix by Steve Nye and it peaked at number 38 in the UK. The B-sides to the 12" single are live versions of "Deviation" and "Obscure Alternatives", which the single states as being taken from the Assemblage Special Edition Cassette. The version of "All Tomorrow's Parties" included on Assemblage is an alternate (early) version recorded and produced by Simon Napier-Bell and Japan.

== Content ==
Assemblage collects recordings from the band's early career (1977–1980) and as shown above Hansa Records re-released no fewer than six singles from Assemblage and Japan's back catalogue between 1981 and 1983.

The first side of the album features songs taken from the band's glam rock period (1977–78) The first track, "Adolescent Sex" differs from the version on the album of the same name as it is a re-recorded version that was first released in August 1978 in the UK as the other side of a double A-side single with "The Unconventional". The second track on Assemblage, "Stateline", was the B-side of "Don't Rain on My Parade", the band's first single.

The album's second side feature some of the band's art pop/synth-pop songs. "Life in Tokyo" is the 1979/1981 single version; the version of "European Son" is the 1980 Japanese B-side to "I Second That Emotion"; "All Tomorrow's Parties" is an alternate (early) version recorded and produced by Simon Napier-Bell and Japan; "Quiet Life" is the album version (which is also the 12" version); and "I Second That Emotion" is the 1980 version.

The bonus tracks for the Special Edition Double Play cassette and the track listing for the Japanese version feature the 12" Steve Nye remixes of "European Son" and "I Second That Emotion". The first bonus track, however, is an alternate mix of "Life in Tokyo" by its producer Giorgio Moroder, lasting 6:17, which was previously unreleased. The cassette incorrectly states that it is the 'Special Remix', which was the 12" single release. The version of "Quiet Life" is exactly the same version as featured previously as track 9. The final three bonus tracks are live versions of "In Vogue", "Deviation" and "Obscure Alternatives", which were originally released in July 1980 as part of the Live in Japan EP which had been recorded in March 1980 in Tokyo.

== Track listing ==
All tracks are written by David Sylvian, except where noted.

Side one
| No. | Title | From the album | Length |
|---|---|---|---|
| 1. | "Adolescent Sex" (Re-recorded version) | original version appeared on Adolescent Sex | 4:15 |
| 2. | "Stateline" | B-side of "Don't Rain on My Parade" single | 4:48 |
| 3. | "Communist China" | Adolescent Sex | 2:43 |
| 4. | "...Rhodesia" | Obscure Alternatives | 6:48 |
| 5. | "Suburban Berlin" | Obscure Alternatives | 5:01 |

Side two
| No. | Title | Writer(s) | From the album | Length |
|---|---|---|---|---|
| 6. | "Life in Tokyo" | Giorgio Moroder, Sylvian | 1979 single | 3:33 |
| 7. | "European Son" | | B-side of 1980 Japanese "I Second That Emotion" single | 3:40 |
| 8. | "All Tomorrow's Parties" (Alternate version) | Lou Reed | original version appeared on Quiet Life | 4:15 |
| 9. | "Quiet Life" | | Quiet Life | 4:53 |
| 10. | "I Second That Emotion" | Smokey Robinson, Al Cleveland | 1980 single | 3:46 |
| Total length: | | | | 43:42 |

1982 'Special Edition Double Play' tape bonus tracks & 1983 Japanese release
| No. | Title | Writer(s) | From the album | Length |
|---|---|---|---|---|
| 11. | "Life in Tokyo" (Moroder "Assemblage" remix) | Moroder, Sylvian | Previously unreleased | 6:17 |
| 12. | "European Son" (Extended remix) | | 1982 Steve Nye 12" remix single | 5:35 |
| 13. | "I Second That Emotion" (Extended remix) | Robinson, Cleveland | 1982 Steve Nye 12" remix single | 5:15 |
| 14. | "Quiet Life" | | Quiet Life | 4:53 |
| 15. | "Fall in Love With Me" | | Quiet Life | 4:30 |
| 16. | "In Vogue" (Live in Tokyo) | | Quiet Life. Live version from Live in Japan EP | 6:07 |
| 17. | "Deviation" (Live in Tokyo) | | Obscure Alternatives. Live version from Live in Japan EP | 3:19 |
| 18. | "Obscure Alternatives" (Live in Tokyo) | | Obscure Alternatives. Live version from Live in Japan EP | 6:05 |

2004 and 2006 reissues bonus tracks
| No. | Title | Writer(s) | Length |
|---|---|---|---|
| 11. | "European Son" (John Punter 12" mix) | | 5:02 |
| 12. | "I Second That Emotion" (12" remix) | Robinson, Cleveland | 5:17 |
| 13. | "Life in Tokyo" (Pt. 1, Special remix) | Moroder, Sylvian | 4:03 |
| 14. | "Life in Tokyo" (12" remix) | Moroder, Sylvian | 6:17 |
| 15. | "I Second That Emotion" (video) | Robinson, Cleveland | 3:39 |
| 16. | "Life in Tokyo" (video) | Moroder, Sylvian | 3:31 |

== Personnel ==
Japan

- David Sylvian – vocals, synthesizers, piano, electric guitar
- Mick Karn – bass guitar, oboe, saxophone, recorder
- Steve Jansen – drums, synthesizer, percussion
- Richard Barbieri – synthesizers, sequencer, piano
- Rob Dean – guitar, ebow

=== Production ===
- Ray Singer – producer (tracks 1–5)
- Pete Silver – sound engineer (tracks 1–3)
- Tracks 1–3 recorded at Audio International Studios
- Chris Tsangarides – sound engineer (tracks 4–5)
- Tracks 4–5 recorded at Morgan Studios
- Giorgio Moroder – producer (track 6)
- Jürgen Koppers – sound engineer (track 6)
- Track 6 recorded at Rusk Sound Studios, Los Angeles
- Simon Napier-Bell – producer (tracks 7–8)
- Japan – producers (tracks 7–8)
- John Punter – remix (tracks 7–8), producer (tracks 9–10)
- Keith Bessey – sound engineer (tracks 7–8)
- Tracks 7–8 recorded at DJM Studios
- Colin Fairley – sound engineer (tracks 9–10)
- Tracks 9–10 recorded at AIR Studios

== Charts ==
| Chart (1981–83) | Peak position |
|---|---|
| Japanese Albums (Oricon) | 45 |
| UK Albums (Official Charts) | 26 |
