= Talking drum (disambiguation) =

A talking drum is an African drum whose pitch can be regulated to mimic human speech.

Talking drum may also refer to:

- "Talking Drum", a song on the album Tin Drum (album) by Japan
- "Talking Drum", a song on the album Exorcising Ghosts by Japan
- "The Talking Drum", a song on the album Larks' Tongues in Aspic by King Crimson

== See also ==
- Drums in communication
