= European Son (Japan song) =

1982 single by Japan

- UK cover

Single by Japan
- B-side: "Alien"
- Released: 8 January 1982
- Recorded: 1979
- Studio: DJM Studios, London
- Genre: Soft rock; art rock
- Length: 3:48
- Label: Hansa
- Songwriter(s): David Sylvian
- Producer(s): Simon Napier-Bell, Japan

Japan singles chronology
"Visions of China" (1981)	"European Son" (1982)	"Ghosts" (1982)

"European Son" is a song by the British band Japan.

The song was written by David Sylvian in 1978 following the band's US tour. It was intended to be the title track of Japan's third album and Sylvian intended to record it with disco producer Giorgio Moroder. However, this did not happen as Moroder preferred the song Life in Tokyo. Japan then recorded the song with Simon Napier-Bell and it was mixed by John Punter.

"European Son" was first released in Japan as the B-side of the single "I Second That Emotion" and on the Canadian Special Edition EP. In 1981 it was released as the B-side of the UK single "Life in Tokyo" and was included on the album Assemblage. In January 1982 a version remixed by Steve Nye was released as a single and became a hit on the UK Singles Chart, peaking at number 31.

== Track listings ==
7": Hansa / HANSA 10 (UK)

1. European Son (Remix) – 3:48
2. Alien – 4:59

12": Hansa / HANSA 12-10 (UK)

1. European Son (Extended Remix) – 5:33
2. Alien – 4:59

== Personnel ==
- David Sylvian – lead vocals, guitar
- Richard Barbieri – synthesizers, keyboards
- Mick Karn – bass guitar, saxophone, vocals
- Rob Dean – guitar, vocals
- Steve Jansen – drums, percussion, vocals
- Steve Nye – remixing
