= Quiet Life =

Studio album by Japan
- Released: 7 December 1979; 18 January 1980 (UK)
- Recorded: June – September 1979
- Studios: AIR (London, UK); DJM (London, England)
- Genres: Synth-pop; art pop; pop rock; new wave; post-punk
- Length: 44:33
- Label: Hansa
- Producers: John Punter; Simon Napier-Bell; Japan

Japan chronology
Obscure Alternatives (1978)	Quiet Life (1979)	Gentlemen Take Polaroids (1980)

Singles from Quiet Life
- 1. "Quiet Life" Released: December 1979

Quiet Life is the third studio album by English new wave band Japan, first released on 7 December 1979 in Canada, Japan and The Netherlands by record label Hansa and on 18 January 1980 in the UK.

The album was a transition from the glam rock-influenced style of previous albums to a synth-pop style. Though sales were initially slow, Quiet Life was the band's first album to chart and was later certified Gold by the British Phonographic Industry for sales in excess of 100,000 copies.

== Background and recording ==
In 1979 Japan collaborated with famed disco producer Giorgio Moroder for the stand alone single, "Life in Tokyo", which featured a dramatic stylistic shift away from the mostly guitar-driven glam rock of their first two albums into an electronic dance style, prefiguring their work on Quiet Life. However, the group did not feel that Moroder was the right choice to produce a full album.

Early material for an album had been considered and dropped, including the proposed title track "European Son", which later appeared on the compilation Assemblage. The band then approached Roxy Music producer John Punter, but he was unavailable at the time and the group began to record with manager Simon Napier-Bell. However, the band learned that Punter was available later in the year and waited for him. Punter worked closely with the group and went on to produce two more albums and tour with them.

With the exception of 'All Tomorrow's Parties' (which was recorded during the early sessions for Quiet Life in the summer of 1979 at DJM Studios in London, produced by Simon Napier-Bell and Japan, and then re-mixed by John Punter), the album was recorded in September 1979 at AIR Studios in London and mastered on 5 November at Trident Studios, with John Punter producing.

Quiet Life was the last of the three albums the band made for the Hansa-Ariola label. The band switched to Virgin Records in 1980. However, Hansa later issued a compilation album (Assemblage) of singles and album highlights from the band's time with the label.

== Content ==
Quiet Life has been described as one of the first albums released during the New Romantic era, though the band themselves always strongly refuted they had any connection or involvement with the New Romantic movement, which was essentially a fashion-based nightclub scene.

In a retrospective review of the band's work, The Quietus characterised the album as defining "a very European form of detached, sexually-ambiguous and thoughtful art-pop, one not too dissimilar to what the ever-prescient David Bowie had delivered two years earlier with Low". The album is notable for being the first album where singer David Sylvian used his newfound baritone vocal style, which became one of the band's most distinctive hallmarks.

Lyrically the title track refers to problems the band was going through at the time, having lost their US record contract and the lack of commercial success in the UK. It has been suggested that the rest of the songs reflect a travelogue relating to impressions the band had gained from touring the world. The oriental sounding "A Foreign Place" was left off the album but later appeared as the B-side on the single "Quiet Life".

In a 1982 interview, Sylvian commented that Quiet Life was the only Japan album that the band worked on together in a truly collaborative manner, as he would come to dominate the recording sessions for subsequent albums, a decision he later regretted. Later in his career, Sylvian said of the album: "I still feel very attached to it – unusual for me. We reached a peak with this album – we knew what we were doing."

== Release ==
Quiet Life was first released in December 1979 in Canada, with journalist Rosalind Russell describing Japan as being a "cult band in Canada" and that the album was "shifting copies like candles in a power strike". The band travelled to Toronto to perform two sets at the Ryerson Theatre on 24 November, which was their first show in six months (and also their last ever performance in North America), and was the first to feature Jane Shorter on saxophone. The album was released in Japan on 20 December 1979 and in the UK on 18 January 1980.

While largely ignored in their home country, Quiet Life was a success in Japan, where it had the distinction of becoming the first foreign rock record to enter the national chart, and went straight in at number 8 in Canada, and also had some success in continental Europe.

Though initially unsuccessful upon its release in the band's native UK (where it peaked at No. 72 in February 1980), the album returned to the charts in early 1982 after the commercial success of 1981's Tin Drum and the Hansa Records compilation Assemblage. It peaked at No. 53, two years after its original release, and was eventually certified "Gold" by the BPI in 1984 for 100,000 copies sold.

The title track, "Quiet Life", was released as a single in Japan in 1979 and in Germany and The Netherlands in 1980. In other countries, including the band's native UK, Hansa chose to promote the album with the standalone single "I Second That Emotion" with "Quiet Life" as the B-side. Neither single was commercially successful. Eighteen months later, in line with the band's increasing popularity and media profile, Hansa released "Quiet Life" as an A-side single in the UK and Ireland in August 1981 (with the instrumental "A Foreign Place" as the B-side). The single reached No. 19 on the UK Singles Chart, becoming Japan's first UK Top 20 hit.

"All Tomorrow's Parties" was remixed by Steve Nye and issued as a single by Hansa in February 1983, two months after Japan had permanently disbanded, and three years after the original album release. It peaked at No. 38 in the UK.

=== Re-issues ===
The album was re-issued in 2001 and 2004 on CD with bonus tracks, with the rights ending up with BMG Rights Management over the following decade. In 2021 BMG re-issued the album in a number of formats including a boxset (featuring three CDs with a 180g half-speed mastered vinyl), a couple of vinyl editions and a CD release. This release far surpassed previous chart peaks and the album reached a new high of no.13 in the UK. Some versions of the 2021 re-issue include Live at the Budokan 27/03/1980. This is an audience recording of the full Budokan show, made on a portable cassette machine. Four tracks from this concert had originally been released in some territories by Hansa in 1980, as the Live in Japan EP. Unlike the bootleg quality of the full show, the EP was produced from professional multitrack recordings made by the band's producer John Punter (who accompanied them on the tour, mixing their live sound).

== Critical reception ==
Professional ratings
Review scores
Source	Rating
AllMusic	4/5 stars
Encyclopedia of Popular Music	3/5 stars
Q	3/5 stars
Record Mirror	4/5 stars
Sounds	4/5 stars

Some contemporary critics dismissed Japan as Roxy Music imitators. "Although [Japan] may seem full-steam ahead, seamlessly 'European' to you," NME's Ian Penman wrote, "it all seems slyly Roxy Stranded to us ancients. Ferry's smoky closure accentuated and crowded into one watery fiction." The album nonetheless received positive reviews from other critics such as Melody Maker's Steve Gett and Sounds editor Geoff Barton, garnering the band some of their first real support from the British music press.

In his retrospective review of the album, AllMusic critic Keith Farley wrote: "Quiet Life is the album that transformed Japan from past-tense glam rockers into futuristic synth popsters, though they'd been leaning in that direction for a while. It's also a solid proto-New Romantic synthesizer record". Trouser Press viewed the selection of John Punter to produce the album as "significant, as the band's sights had shifted from gutter-glam to elegant decadence." Writing for The Quietus, Joseph Burnett called Quiet Life "an album that pushed the elegant, improbably-coiffed Sylvian into the limelight, aided and abetted by some of the band's best songs". Burnett found that it deserved to be ranked alongside Cabaret Voltaire's Mix-Up (1979), the Human League's Travelogue and Orchestral Manoeuvres in the Dark's self-titled debut (both 1980) as "one of the key early British synth-based pop/rock albums".

== Legacy ==
Quiet Life appears in the book 1001 Albums You Must Hear Before You Die.

== Track listing ==
All tracks are written by David Sylvian, except for "All Tomorrow's Parties", written by Lou Reed. All songs arranged by Japan.

Side one
No.	Title	Length
1.	"Quiet Life"	4:53
2.	"Fall in Love with Me"	4:31
3.	"Despair"	5:56
4.	"In Vogue"	6:30

Side two
No.	Title	Length
5.	"Halloween"	4:24
6.	"All Tomorrow's Parties"	5:43
7.	"Alien"	5:01
8.	"The Other Side of Life"	7:26

2001 UK CD reissue bonus tracks
No.	Title	Writer(s)	Length
9.	"All Tomorrow's Parties" (12" version)	Lou Reed	5:17
10.	"A Foreign Place" (B-side to the 1981 "Quiet Life" single)	Sylvian, Barbieri	3:12
11.	"Quiet Life" (12" version)	Sylvian	4:50
12.	"Life in Tokyo" (12" version)	Sylvian, Giorgio Moroder	7:05

2004 and 2006 UK remastered CD reissues bonus tracks
No.	Title	Writer(s)	Length
9.	"All Tomorrow's Parties" (12" version)		5:15
10.	"All Tomorrow's Parties" (7" mix)		3:33
11.	"A Foreign Place"	Sylvian, Barbieri	3:10
12.	"Quiet Life" (7" mix)		3:51
13.	"Quiet Life" (video)		3:51

The band originally intended for the track listing to be 1) All Tomorrow's Parties, 2) Fall in Love with Me, 3) Alien, 4) Quiet Life, 5) The Other Side of Life, 6) Despair, 7) In Vogue, 8) Halloween, 9) A Foreign Place, and the notes in the CD cover booklet of the 2006 remastered edition suggest that the listener should try listening to the album in that order.

=== 2021 deluxe edition bonus tracks ===
A Quieter Life: Alternative Mixes & Rarities and Live in Japan EP
No.	Title	Writer(s)	Length
1.	"European Son" (Steve Nye 7" remix 1982)		3:50
2.	"Life in Tokyo" (Steve Nye 7" special remix 1982)	Sylvian, Moroder	4:03
3.	"Quiet Life" (Original German 7" mix 1980)		3:53
4.	"I Second That Emotion" (Steve Nye 7" remix 1982)	Smokey Robinson, Al Cleveland	3:56
5.	"All Tomorrow's Parties" (Steve Nye 7" remix version 1983)	Reed	3:35
6.	"European Son" (John Punter 12" mix 1980)		5:01
7.	"Life in Tokyo" (Steve Nye 12" special remix version 1982)	Sylvian, Moroder	7:06
8.	"I Second That Emotion" (Steve Nye 12" remix version 1982)	Robinson, Cleveland	5:17
9.	"All Tomorrow's Parties" (Steve Nye 12" remix version 1983)	Reed	5:17
10.	"European Son" (Steve Nye 12" remix version 1982)		5:35
11.	"Quiet Life" (Japanese 7" mix 1980)		4:14
12.	"A Foreign Place"	Sylvian, Barbieri	3:16
13.	"All Tomorrow's Parties" (John Punter 7" mix 1979)	Reed	4:14
14.	"Life in Tokyo" (Theme Giorgio Moroder version 1979)	Sylvian, Moroder	2:03
15.	"Deviation" (Live in Japan)		3:20
16.	"Obscure Alternatives" (Live in Japan)		6:05
17.	"In-Vogue" (Live in Japan)		6:11
18.	"Sometimes I Feel So Low" (Live in Japan)		4:04

Live at Budokan 27/03/1980
No.	Title	Writer(s)	Length
1.	"Despair (Intro)"		1:30
2.	"Alien"		5:44
3.	"...Rhodesia"		6:08
4.	"Quiet Life"		4:47
5.	"Fall in Love with Me"		4:14
6.	"Deviation"		3:34
7.	"All Tomorrow's Parties"	Reed	5:30
8.	"Obscure Alternatives"		6:30
9.	"In-Vogue"		6:15
10.	"Life in Tokyo"	Sylvian, Moroder	6:18
11.	"Halloween"		4:01
12.	"Sometimes I Feel So Low"		4:06
13.	"Communist China"		3:12
14.	"Adolescent Sex"		4:56
15.	"I Second That Emotion"		3:50
16.	"Automatic Gun"		3:55

== Personnel ==
Japan

- David Sylvian – lead vocals, guitar, production
- Rob Dean – guitar, backing vocals, production
- Richard Barbieri – synthesizer, keyboards, production
- Mick Karn – bass, backing vocals, saxophone, flute, production
- Steve Jansen – drums, backing vocals, percussion, production

Additional personnel

- Ann Odell – orchestral arrangements
- Martyn Ford – orchestral conduction

Technical

- John Punter – production, engineering
- Simon Napier-Bell – production
- Colin Fairley – engineering
- Keith Bessey – engineering on "All Tomorrow's Parties"

== Charts ==
Chart (1980)	Peak position
Canada Top Albums/CDs (RPM)	81
Japanese Albums (Oricon)	24
UK Albums (Official Charts)	72

Chart (1982)	Peak position
UK Albums (Official Charts)	53

Chart (2021)	Peak position
Belgian Albums (Ultratop Wallonia)	148
German Albums (Offizielle Top 100)	32
Irish Albums (IRMA)	89
Scottish Albums (Official Charts)	5
Swedish Vinyl Albums (Sverigetopplistan)	3
UK Albums (Official Charts)	13
UK Vinyl Albums (OCC)	2

== Certifications ==
Region	Certification	Certified units/sales
United Kingdom (BPI)	Gold	100,000^{^}
^{^} Shipments figures based on certification alone.
