= Tin drum =

Tin drum and similar may refer to:

- The Tin Drum, a 1959 novel by Günter Grass
- The Tin Drum (film), the film adaptation of that novel
- Tin Drum (album), a 1981 album by the new wave/art pop band Japan

== See also ==
- Tyndrum, a town in Scotland
