= JBK =

JBK may refer to:

- JBK (music), an English band
- Barikewa language
- Jakobstads Bollklubb, a Finnish soccer team
- Jacqueline Bouvier Kennedy
- Qitai Jiangbulake Airport, China (IATA code JBK)
