= Visions of China =

1981 single by Japan

Single by Japan

from the album Tin Drum
- B-side: "Taking Islands in Africa" (7"); "Swing" (12")
- Released: 30 October 1981
- Recorded: 1981
- Genre: New wave
- Length: 3:35
- Label: Virgin
- Songwriter(s): David Sylvian; Steve Jansen
- Producer(s): Japan; Steve Nye

Japan singles chronology
"I Second That Emotion" (1980)	"Visions of China" (1981)	"Ghosts" (1982)

Visions of China is a song by English new wave band Japan, released in October 1981 as the second single from their 1981 album Tin Drum, which was released on 13 November. The single reached number 32 on the UK Singles Chart.

It was ranked number 87 in Sounds list of top 100 songs of all time.

== Content ==
The B-side of the 7" is a remix of "Taking Islands in Africa", the final track on their previous album Gentlemen Take Polaroids (1980). The track was written by David Sylvian and Ryuichi Sakamoto, with whom Sylvian would collaborate on several recordings in the future. The 12" version features the longer track "Swing", again from Gentlemen Take Polaroids.

== Track listings ==
7"

1. "Visions of China" – 3.35
2. "Taking Islands in Africa (Remix)" – 4.35

12"

1. "Visions of China" – 3.38
2. "Swing" – 6.25

== Versions ==
The song was lifted straight from the album for the single release and no alternative studio versions or remixes have been released. A live recording of the song is included on the Oil on Canvas album and was issued together with a live recording of the instrumental track "Canton" as a single in 1982. Oil on Canvas was also issued in VHS format and as a DVD in 2006. A promotional music video was made to promote the original single and is also included on the 2006 compilation DVD The Very Best of Japan together with the live performance of "Visions of China".

The single was re-released on 10 December 1984 with the same track listing and catalogue number as the original release to promote the compilation Exorcising Ghosts, which had been released two weeks prior.

== Personnel ==
On "Visions of China":

- David Sylvian — vocals, keyboards, programming
- Richard Barbieri — keyboards, programming
- Mick Karn — fretless bass, dida
- Steve Jansen — drums, percussion, keyboard percussion

On "Taking Islands in Africa (Remix)":

- David Sylvian — vocals, additional keyboards
- Richard Barbieri — synth bass
- Steve Jansen — African drums, percussion, keyboards
- Ryuichi Sakamoto — keyboards, keyboard percussion
