= Life in Tokyo =

1979 single by Japan

- 1979 cover

Single by Japan
- B-side: "Life in Tokyo (Part 2)" (1979); "European Son" (1981); "Life in Tokyo (Theme)" (1982)
- Released: 13 April 1979; 17 April 1981; 27 September 1982
- Recorded: March 1979
- Studio: Rusk Sound (Los Angeles)
- Genre: New wave; synth-pop; art pop; disco
- Length: 3:30 (1979 & 1981 7" version); 3:59 (1982 7" remix)
- Label: Ariola Hansa; Hansa
- Songwriters: Giorgio Moroder; David Sylvian
- Producer: Giorgio Moroder

Japan singles chronology
"Deviation" (1979)	"Life in Tokyo" (1979)	"Quiet Life" (1979)

Japan singles chronology
"The Art of Parties" (1981)	"Life in Tokyo" (1981)	"Quiet Life" (1981)

Japan singles chronology
"I Second That Emotion" (1982)	"Life in Tokyo" (1982)	"Nightporter" (1982)

Alternative cover
- 1982 release cover

"Life in Tokyo" is a song by the British band Japan. A collaboration with disco producer Giorgio Moroder, who also co-wrote the song with David Sylvian, it marked a change of direction from the band's previous sound. Originally released as a single in 1979, it was reissued twice before it finally became a hit on the UK Singles Chart in 1982.

== Composition ==
The song was written by Giorgio Moroder and band vocalist David Sylvian. The musical style is in line with Moroder's electronic disco style as already employed on albums by Donna Summer, Munich Machine and on his own From Here to Eternity in 1977. Moroder's trademark arpeggiated synthesiser can be heard throughout the track.

== Release ==
The single was originally released in 1979 in 7" and 12" formats, the latter accommodating a longer version, again reflecting Moroder's style of producing disco versions such as with Donna Summer's "I Feel Love". The single failed to become a hit in the UK.

It was released again by Hansa in early 1981, after the band had enjoyed moderate success in 1980 with their album Gentlemen Take Polaroids, released by Virgin. This release featured "European Son" as the B-side, although again failed to chart.

The single was released a third and final time in October 1982, after the band's success with the Tin Drum album and singles such as "Ghosts" and "Cantonese Boy". This issue was a remixed version by Steve Nye and finally made "Life In Tokyo" a hit reaching no. 28 in the UK singles chart. Its release was supported by the group themselves, with Sylvian co-ordinating the sleeve design. Both sides feature "Life in Tokyo", with a new 12" remix. The B-side, "Life In Tokyo Theme" is an approximately 2 minute instrumental version of the song, but doubled in length by being presented in a drastically slowed down mix.

== Track listings ==
7": Ariola Hansa / AHA 540 (1979, UK)

1. "Life in Tokyo" (Short Version) – 3:30
2. "Life in Tokyo" (Part 2) – 3:29

7" Ariola America / 7756 (1979, US)

1. "Life in Tokyo" – 3:30
2. "Love Is Infectious" – 4:09

12": Ariola Hansa / AHAD 540 (1979, UK)

1. "Life in Tokyo" (Long Version) – 7:05
2. "Life in Tokyo" (Short Version) – 3:30

12": Ariola America / AR 9019 (1979, US)

1. "Life in Tokyo" (Long Version) – 7:05
2. "Love Is Infectious" – 4:09

7": Hansa / HANSA 4 (1981, UK)

1. "Life in Tokyo" – 3:30
2. "European Son" – 3:37

12": Hansa / HANSA 12-4 (1981, UK)

1. "Life in Tokyo" (Extended Version) – 7:05
2. "European Son" (Extended) – 5:00

7": Hansa / HANSA 17 (1982, UK)

1. "Life in Tokyo" (Special Remix) – 3:59
2. "Life in Tokyo" (Theme) – 3:53

12": Hansa / HANSA 12-17 (1982, UK)

1. "Life in Tokyo" (Extended Remix) – 7:05
2. "Life in Tokyo" (Theme) – 3:53

== Charts ==
Chart (1982)	Peak position
Ireland (IRMA)	26
UK Singles (Official Charts)	28
