= Best Selection =

Best Selection may refer to:

- Best Selection (Aimer album), 2017
- Best Selection 2010, an album by TVXQ, 2010
- Best Selection, an album by Japan, 1994
- Best Selection, an album by Jimsaku, 1995
