= I Second That Emotion =

1967 single by Smokey Robinson & the Miracles

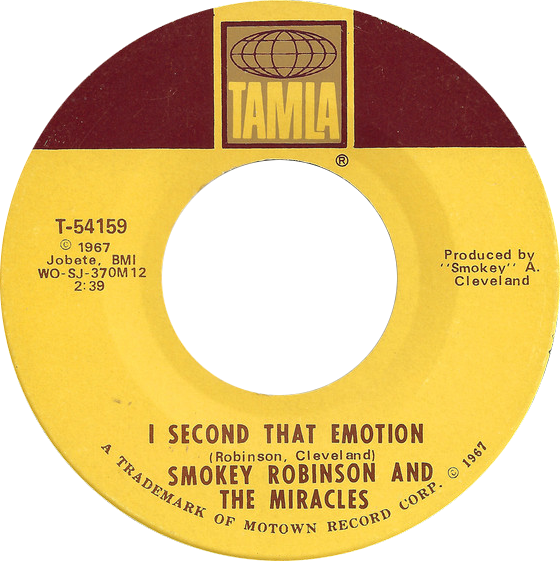
- One of side-A labels of the US single

Single by Smokey Robinson & the Miracles
- B-side: "You Must Be Love"
- Released: October 19, 1967
- Recorded: September 21, 1967
- Studio: Hitsville U.S.A. (Studio A)
- Genre: Soul
- Length: 2:48
- Label: Motown T 54159
- Songwriters: Smokey Robinson; Al Cleveland
- Producers: Smokey Robinson; Al Cleveland

Smokey Robinson & the Miracles singles chronology
"More Love" (1967)	"I Second That Emotion" (1967)	"If You Can Want" (1968)

Audio
- "I Second That Emotion" on YouTube

"I Second That Emotion" is a 1967 song written by Smokey Robinson and Al Cleveland. First charting as a hit for Smokey Robinson and the Miracles on the Tamla/Motown label in 1967, "I Second That Emotion" was later a hit single for the group duet Diana Ross & the Supremes and the Temptations, also on the Motown label.

== Song origin ==
One morning in 1967, Robinson and Cleveland were shopping at Hudson's, a Detroit department store. Robinson found a set of pearls for his wife, Claudette. "They're beautiful." he said to the salesperson. "I sure hope she likes them." Cleveland then added "I second that emotion." Both songwriters laughed at Cleveland's malapropism - a pun on the phrase "I second that motion." The two were immediately inspired to write a song using the incorrect phrase.

== The Miracles' original version ==
The Miracles' original version of the song finds lead singer and co-writer Smokey Robinson courting a girl who, weary of the game of love, prefers to string her boyfriends along and not get romantically involved. Robinson "wants no part" in such a relationship, but promises that if the girl changes her mind, he'll be around ("If you feel like lovin' me/if you've got the notion/I second that emotion.")

This version peaked for three weeks in the United States at No. 4 on the Billboard Hot 100 in December 1967. It became the Miracles highest charting popular single since "Shop Around". In this song, guitarists Eddie Willis and Robert White came up with their own guitar licks and riffs for this song based on a chord chart that was given to them by Robinson (this is a classic example of the creativity the Funk Brothers brought to the table during the recording sessions they participated in at the Snake Pit). Regular Miracles guitarist Marv Tarplin was also present on the song.

The song also topped the Billboard Best Selling R&B Singles chart and was a million-selling hit for The Miracles, their sixth overall. The song was also a top 30 hit in the UK in 1967, reaching No. 27.

Cash Box called it an "electrically sparkling slow-midspeed session" with "outstanding lead and the well worked team sound."

=== Personnel ===
The Miracles

- Lead vocals by Smokey Robinson
- Background vocals by Claudette Rogers Robinson, Pete Moore, Ronnie White, and Bobby Rogers.
- Guitar by Marv Tarplin
- Other instrumentation by the Funk Brothers
  - Eddie Willis – guitar
  - Robert White – guitar

=== Charts ===
Chart (1967–1968)	Peak position
Australia (Kent Music Report)	98
Canada (CHUM)	2
Canada Soul Survey (RPM)	3
UK Singles (Official Charts)	27
US Billboard Hot 100	4
US Hot R&B/Hip-Hop Songs (Billboard)	1
US Cash Box Top 100	3

== Diana Ross & the Supremes and the Temptations version ==
"I Second That Emotion"
- Solid center variant of the UK single

Single by Diana Ross & the Supremes and the Temptations

from the album Diana Ross & the Supremes Join the Temptations
- B-side: "The Way You Do the Things You Do"
- Released: September 20, 1969 (UK)
- Recorded: 1968
- Studio: Hitsville U.S.A. (Studio A)
- Genre: Soul; pop
- Length: 2:19
- Label: Motown TM 709
- Songwriters: Smokey Robinson; Al Cleveland
- Producer: Frank Wilson

Diana Ross & the Supremes singles chronology
"No Matter What Sign You Are" (1969)	"I Second That Emotion" (1969)	"Someday We'll Be Together" (1969)

The Temptations singles chronology
"I Can't Get Next to You" (1969)	"I Second That Emotion" (1969)	"Psychedelic Shack" (1969)

Diana Ross & the Supremes Join the Temptations track listing
- 11 tracks Side one: 1. "Try It Baby"; 2. "I Second That Emotion"; 3. "Ain't No Mountain High Enough"; 4. "I'm Gonna Make You Love Me"; 5. "This Guy's in Love with You"; 6. "Funky Broadway"; Side two: 7. "I'll Try Something New"; 8. "A Place in the Sun"; 9. "Sweet Inspiration"; 10. "Then"; 11. "The Impossible Dream"

Audio
- "I Second That Emotion" on YouTube

The song was covered and released by a group duet of Motown labelmates Diana Ross & the Supremes and the Temptations in 1969. This version peaked at No. 18 in the UK.

=== Personnel ===
- Lead vocals by Diana Ross and Eddie Kendricks
- Background vocals by Mary Wilson, Cindy Birdsong, Dennis Edwards, Paul Williams, Otis Williams, and Melvin Franklin
- Instrumentation by the Funk Brothers
- Guitar by Marv Tarplin

=== Track listing ===
7" single (1969) (United Kingdom)

1. "I Second That Emotion" – 2:55
2. "The Way You Do the Things You Do" – 1:39

=== Charts ===
Chart (1969)	Peak position
Iceland (Íslenski Listinn)	20
UK Singles (Official Charts)	18
UK R&B (Record Mirror)	2

== Japan version ==
"I Second That Emotion"
- One of the UK covers of the 1982 release

Single by Japan
- B-side: "Quiet Life" (1980); "Halloween" (1982)
- Released: 21 March 1980; June 1982
- Genre: New wave
- Length: 3:45 (1980); 3:52 (1982 remix); 5:15 (1982 extended remix)
- Label: Ariola Hansa; Hansa
- Songwriters: Smokey Robinson; Al Cleveland
- Producer: John Punter

Japan singles chronology
"Life in Tokyo" (1979)	"I Second That Emotion" (1980)	"Gentlemen Take Polaroids" (1980)

Japan singles chronology
"Cantonese Boy" (1982)	"I Second That Emotion" (1982)	"Life in Tokyo" (1982)

Music video
- "I Second That Emotion" on YouTube

"I Second That Emotion" was covered by British new wave band Japan, originally released as a single in 1980 without success. The single was re-released in 1982, on the back of the band's increased success in 1981, peaking at number 9 on the UK Singles Chart in July, making it their second most successful single after "Ghosts".

=== Releases ===
The song was first released in March 1980 in the UK with a fade-out version of "Quiet Life" on the B-side. In Japan, "Quiet Life" had been released as a single in 1979, so "European Son" was released as the B-side instead. In 1982, the song was remixed by Steve Nye and released as a single, with the B-side "Halloween" originally released on the album Quiet Life. In Australia, the single's B-side was the 1978 re-recorded version of "Adolescent Sex", of which the original version appears on the band's debut album of the same name.

=== Track listings ===
7": Ariola Hansa / AHA 559 (1980, UK)

1. "I Second That Emotion" – 3:45
2. "Quiet Life" – 3:51

7": Ariola Hansa / VIPX-1501 (1980, Japan)

1. "I Second That Emotion" – 3:46
2. "European Son" – 3:40

7": Hansa / HANSA 12 (1982, UK)

1. "I Second That Emotion" – 3:52
2. "Halloween" – 4:23

12": Hansa / HANSA 12-12 (1982, UK)

1. "I Second That Emotion" (extended remix) – 5:15
2. "Halloween" – 4:23

7": RCA Victor / 104039 (1982, Australia)

1. "I Second That Emotion" – 3:50
2. "Adolescent Sex" – 4:10

=== Personnel ===
- David Sylvian – vocals, guitar, keyboards
- Richard Barbieri – keyboards
- Rob Dean – guitar
- Mick Karn – fretless bass, saxophone
- Steve Jansen – drums
- John Punter – producer
- Nigel Walker – engineer
- Steve Nye – remixing (1982)

=== Charts ===
Chart (1980)	Peak position
Japan (Oricon Singles Chart)	87

Chart (1982)	Peak position
Ireland (IRMA)	14
UK Singles (Official Charts)	9

== In popular culture ==
The song was often performed by the Jerry Garcia Band. Between the years 1976 to 1994, the Jerry Garcia Band performed the song 156 times, not including seven live performances by the Grateful Dead.

In 1983, the song appeared on The Big Chill soundtrack Disc 1, Track 8.

"I Second That Emotion" is the title of a 1999 Futurama episode.

In the 2005 film Madagascar, in the scene where the penguins arrive on the boat, the captain is listening to this song before one of the penguins hits him on the back of the head. The title also appears in the film Pride, released in 2014.

On June 18, 2012, American Songwriter named "I Second That Emotion" its "Lyric of The Week". The publication wrote: the song "marches to the beat of its own drum, thanks to three stanzas of crafty doo-wop poetry and one punny one-liner—a malapropism, if you want to get technical—that never really loses its novelty appeal".
