= Exit North =

British/Swedish musical quartet

- Origin: Gothenburg, Sweden, London, England
- Genres: Art rock, ambient pop, chamber pop
- Years active: 2014–present
- Members: Steve Jansen; Charlie Storm; Ulf Jansson; Thomas Feiner
- Website: www.exitnorthmusic.com

Exit North is a musical collaboration between former Japan-drummer Steve Jansen, singer Thomas Feiner, piano player Ulf Jansson and multi-instrumentalist/engineer/producer Charlie Storm.

They released their first album Book of Romance and Dust in 2018.

Apart from Jansen, the other three members are Swedish musicians, from Gothenburg.

== Background ==
Steve Jansen established a co-writing connection with Thomas Feiner in 2007 for his first solo album "Slope". He co-wrote the track "Sow The Salt." For Jansen's second album "Tender Extinction", he co-wrote the track "Captured."

They felt they had similar motivations in music and in 2014, Jansen proposed the idea of forming a more permanent partnership and making an album together. Feiner had been co-composing some sketches and ideas with Ulf Jansson, so this was the starting point for new material and they became a three-piece. Feiner had earlier forged a friendship with Charlie Storm, who also knew Ulf Jansson, who had worked as a session pianist on some acts Storm had produced.

From start to completion, the album was a four-year journey, recorded in Storm's studio in Gothenburg.

Feiner was a singer in the Swedish band Anywhen who re-released their album "The Opiates" in 2008 on David Sylvians Samadhi Sound label.

Jansen said to John Earls February 2021: "Exit North are working on new songs for our second album. I would have been spending time in Sweden over recent months to significantly move things forward, but for obvious reasons that hasn't been possible. As we co-compose everything, we allow the material to lead us. Our first album, Book Of Romance And Dust, was quite a classic singer-songwriter collection overall, except with a focus on musical passages to carry the listener on a bit of a journey. We feel this is what we achieve well together, and I'm sure we'll be following on a similar path." Exit North released their second album "Anyway, Still" in April 2023.

== Members ==
- Ulf Jansson – piano, keyboards
- Charlie Storm – synthesiser, guitar, bass, vocals
- Steve Jansen – keyboards, drums, percussion, sound design, backing vocals
- Thomas Feiner – lead vocals, trumpet, additional piano, additional guitar, harmonium

== Discography ==
=== Albums ===
- 2018 - Book of Romance and Dust
- 2023 - Anyway, Still

=== Singles ===
- 2020 - Let Their Hearts Desire
- 2025 - Harm / Terms
