= The Dolphin Brothers =

The Dolphin Brothers were a new wave/alternative band featuring Steve Jansen and Richard Barbieri, both previously of the band Japan. The band released one album, Catch the Fall in 1987, featuring Jansen on drums, percussion, keyboards and lead vocals, and Barbieri on keyboards and synthesizers.

Additional personnel on the album included Phil Palmer, David Rhodes, Danny Thompson, Matthew Seligman, the Blue Nile's Robert Bell and Martin Ditcham.

The Dolphin Brothers music has been described as similar to the works of Japan, David Sylvian, Talk Talk, Arcadia, the Blue Nile and China Crisis.

Catch the Fall proved to be the Dolphin Brothers only album, following poor sales Jansen and Barbieri departed from Virgin Records but continued working together with a more experimental approach on a number of subsequent releases.

== Discography ==
- Catch the Fall
1. "Catch the Fall"
2. "Shining"
3. "Second Sight"
4. "Love That You Need"
5. "Real Life, Real Answers"
6. "Host to the Holy"
7. "My Winter"
8. "Pushing the River"

A bonus track was included on the Japanese edition of the album called "Face to Face".
