= Oil on Canvas =

Live album by Japan
- Released: 10 June 1983
- Recorded: November 1982
- Venues: Hammersmith Odeon, London
- Genres: New wave; art pop; synth-pop
- Length: 71:54
- Label: Virgin
- Producers: John Punter; Japan

Japan chronology
Tin Drum (1981)	Oil on Canvas (1983)	Rain Tree Crow (1991)

Singles from Oil on Canvas
- 1. "Canton" Released: 13 May 1983

Oil on Canvas is a live album by the English band Japan, released in June 1983 by Virgin Records. It was released six months after the band had broken up, and became their highest charting album in the UK, peaking at number 5. It has been certified Gold by the British Phonographic Industry for sales in excess of 100,000 copies.

== Content ==
The live tracks on the double-album were taken from the band's performances at the Hammersmith Odeon in November 1982, during their final live concert tour. With guitarist Rob Dean having left the band in spring 1981, Japanese musician Masami Tsuchiya (then of the group Ippu-Do) was added to the touring line-up on guitar and additional keyboards. The band also used backing tracks to supply additional instrumental parts (for example, in contrast to some previous tours where a guest saxophonist was recruited, many of Karn's saxophone lines were played from tape.)

Billed as a live recording, Jansen later admitted that only the drums were actually recorded live, the rest being recorded in a studio. The album also contained three new instrumental studio tracks ("Oil on Canvas", "Voices Raised in Welcome, Hands Held in Prayer" and "Temple of Dawn"), recorded separately by Sylvian, Sylvian/Jansen and Barbieri respectively (the name of Barbieri's track is taken from the novel The Temple of Dawn by the acclaimed Japanese novelist Yukio Mishima).

== Release and aftermath ==
Although the album was released some months following the band's much publicised split in December 1982, it was Japan's highest charting album in the UK (where it reached No. 5), a rare feat for a live album. The album was certified "Gold" by the BPI in 1988 for 100,000 copies sold.

A single, "Canton", was released, with the B-side "Visions of China". It reached No. 42 in the UK Singles Chart.

A video version of Oil on Canvas was also released by Virgin Records. This was re-released on DVD in 2006 as "The Very Best of Japan", which also features many of the band's promotional videos.

Seven years after the release of Oil on Canvas the four members of Japan, David Sylvian, Steve Jansen, Mick Karn and Richard Barbieri, reunited for another studio album, under the group moniker Rain Tree Crow.

A remastered CD reissue came out in 2003 with the cover art changed to only showing the slightly cropped and less colourful Auerbach painting.

== Reception ==
Professional ratings
Review scores
Source	Rating
AllMusic	4/5 stars
Encyclopedia of Popular Music	2/5 stars
Number One	4/5 stars
Record Mirror	5/5 stars
Smash Hits	2/10
Uncut	2/5 stars

Reviewing for Record Mirror, Betty Page described the album as "elegiac; very 'remember us this way', but also very 'Sunday Times colour supplement special offer'." "The visuals you can get elsewhere, of course, but you don't miss them. The aural ambience is perfectly sufficient to wallow in the privacy of your own home environment. It's all very Habitat: elegant but with simple curves, très ergonomic, adding a touch of sophistication to any colour scheme. It's not intended to make any converts, thank God, but it'll surely make a sad but satisfying memorial for the ever present ranks of devotees".

== Track listing ==
All tracks are written by David Sylvian, except where noted.

Side one
No.	Title	Writer(s)	Length
1.	"Oil on Canvas" (instrumental studio recording)		1:25
2.	"Sons of Pioneers"	Sylvian, Mick Karn	4:59
3.	"Gentlemen Take Polaroids"		6:41
4.	"Swing"		5:36

Side two
No.	Title	Writer(s)	Length
5.	"Cantonese Boy"		3:45
6.	"Visions of China"	Sylvian, Steve Jansen	3:34
7.	"Ghosts"		6:23
8.	"Voices Raised in Welcome, Hands Held in Prayer" (instrumental studio recording)	Sylvian, Jansen	3:30

Side three
No.	Title	Length
9.	"Nightporter"	6:47
10.	"Still Life in Mobile Homes"	5:37
11.	"Methods of Dance"	6:07

Side four
No.	Title	Writer(s)	Length
12.	"Quiet Life"		4:34
13.	"The Art of Parties"		5:28
14.	"Canton"	Sylvian, Jansen	5:43
15.	"Temple of Dawn" (instrumental studio recording)	Richard Barbieri	1:45
Total length:			71:54

Note: some early CD pressings of the Oil on Canvas album omit the tracks "Gentlemen Take Polaroids" and "Swing".

== Personnel ==
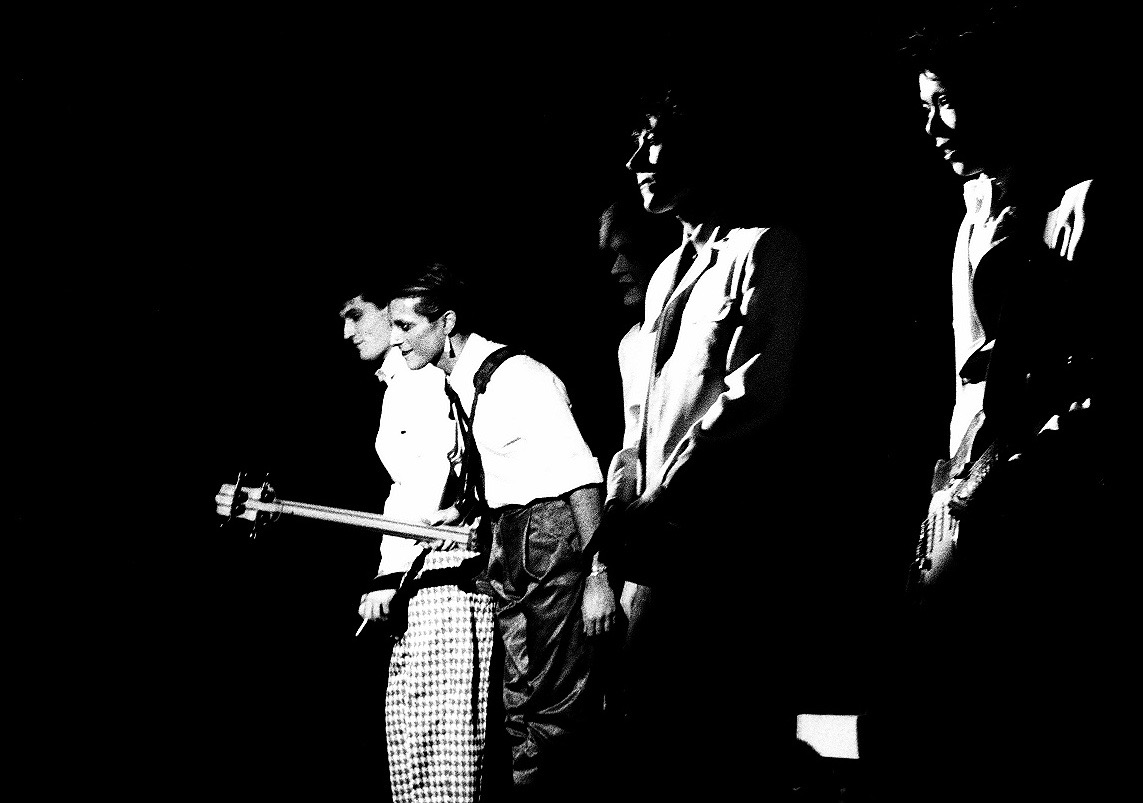
Steve Jansen, Mick Karn, David Sylvian, Rich Barbieri, and guest Masami Tsuchiya

Japan

- David Sylvian: lead vocals, occasional keyboards, cover concept
- Mick Karn: fretless bass guitar, backing vocals, clarinet, saxophone
- Steve Jansen: drums, marimba
- Richard Barbieri: keyboards/synthesizers

Additional personnel

- Masami Tsuchiya: electric guitar, keyboards, tapes
- Nigel Walker: engineering
- John Punter: engineering
- Frank Auerbach: cover painting
- Anton Corbijn: photography
- Ivette Anna: photography (handtinting)

== Charts ==
Chart (1983)	Peak position
Canada Top Albums/CDs (RPM)	91
Dutch Albums (Album Top 100)	29
Japanese Albums (Oricon)	11
New Zealand Albums (RMNZ)	20
Swedish Albums (Sverigetopplistan)	35
UK Albums (Official Charts)	5
