= The Art of Parties =

1981 single by Japan

Single by Japan

from the album Tin Drum
- B-side: "Life Without Buildings"; "My New Career" (Aus and Jpn)
- Released: 1 May 1981
- Recorded: March 1981
- Studio: Basing Street Studios. London
- Genre: Art pop; new wave
- Length: 3:55 (7"); 6:41 (12")
- Label: Virgin
- Songwriter: David Sylvian
- Producers: John Punter; Japan

Japan singles chronology
"Gentlemen Take Polaroids" (1980)	"The Art of Parties" (1981)	"Visions of China" (1981)

"The Art of Parties" is a song by the British band Japan.

It was released as a single in May 1981 and reached number 48 on the UK Singles Chart. A re-worked version was subsequently included as the opening track on the band's album Tin Drum released later in 1981, keeping parts of the original Punter-produced version including guitars. A live version of the song is included on Japan's 1983 album Oil on Canvas and on the DVD release The Very Best of Japan.

== Critical reception ==
Upon its release, Smash Hits' Mark Ellen described the single as "a safety shot"; "This keeps a finger in every pie known to modern music. A 12" with titles filched from the Talking Heads camp, the topside's technical funk with Sylvian's voice a rare bond of operatic Bowie and Ferry at his most plaintive. The reverse is a few of their favourite synths. Good."

The Rough Guide to Rock described the song genre as "white-boy funk".

== Personnel ==
On "The Art of Parties":

- David Sylvian — lead vocals, guitars, treated piano, brass arrangements
- Richard Barbieri — synthesizers
- Mick Karn — fretless bass, brass arrangements
- Steve Jansen — drums, percussion
- backing vocals – Jay Yates, Pearly Gates, Ruby James
- horns — Cliff Hardy, Martin Drover, Mel Collins

On "Life Without Buildings":

- David Sylvian — lead vocals, synthetic brass
- Richard Barbieri — synthesizers, tapes
- Mick Karn — fretless bass, finger cymbals
- Steve Jansen — drums, acoustic and synthetic percussion

Technical

- John Punter — production, mixing
- Andy Lyden — engineer

== Track listings ==
7": Virgin / VS 409 (UK)

1. "The Art of Parties" – 3.55
2. "Life Without Buildings" – 6:40

12": Virgin / VS 409-12 (UK)

1. "The Art of Parties" – 6.41
2. "Life Without Buildings" – 6.40

7": Virgin / VS 409 / VIPX-1580 (Australia and Japan)

1. "The Art of Parties" – 3.55
2. "My New Career" – 3.52

12": Virgin / VS 409-12 (Australia)

1. "The Art of Parties" – 6:41
2. "My New Career" – 3:52

EP: Virgin / VEP 305 (Canada)

1. "The Art of Parties" – 6:41
2. "The Width of a Room" – 3:14
3. "Life Without Buildings" – 6:40
4. "The Experience of Swimming" – 4:06

7" Promo: Virgin / 0267 (Spain, 1982)

1. "The Art of Parties" (album version) – 4:11
2. "Visions of China" – 3:55
