= JBK (music) =

JBK or Jansen Barbieri Karn, is the name by which former Japan and Rain Tree Crow band members Steve Jansen, Richard Barbieri and Mick Karn recorded several albums of music, all released by their own Medium Productions label, between 1993 and 2001.

After the band project Rain Tree Crow was disbanded in 1991, the remaining three members decided to create a recording label so they could continue to creatively collaborate as well with other artists, without any pressure from record companies. Also without a principal songwriter, like David Sylvian, they had the freedom to express their ideas and experiment. The band's music style was an experimental, ambient, progressive art rock with influence of electronic music. In their studio and live recordings JBK also collaborated with Porcupine Tree frontman Steven Wilson, fellow ex-Japan member Rob Dean, guitarists Aziz Ibrahim, David Torn, Sugizo, Masami Tsuchiya, saxophonist Theo Travis, and vocalists Zoe Niblett, Robby Aceto among others.

== Discography ==
Studio album

- 1993 – Beginning to Melt (Medium Productions)
- 1999 – _Ism (Medium)

EPs

- 1994 – Seed (Medium)
- 2016 – Breakable Moons (Session Outtakes)

Live album

- 2001 – Playing in a Room with People (Medium)

Compilation album

- 1999 – Medium Label Sampler (Medium)
