= Quiet Life (song) =

Single by Japan

- 1981 UK single cover

Single by Japan

from the album Quiet Life and Assemblage
- B-side: "Halloween" (1979); "I Second That Emotion" (1980); "A Foreign Place" (1981)
- Released: December 1979 (Japan); March 1980 (EU); 21 August 1981 (UK)
- Genre: Disco-pop; synth-pop; new wave
- Length: 4:14 (1979 single); 3:51 (1980 single & UK B-side); 3:34 (1981 7" edit); 4:50 (1981 12"; Quiet Life & Assemblage album version)
- Label: Ariola; Hansa
- Songwriter: David Sylvian
- Producer: John Punter

Japan singles chronology
"Life in Tokyo" (1979)	"Quiet Life" (1979)	"I Second That Emotion" (1980)

Japan singles chronology
"I Second That Emotion" (1980)	"Quiet Life" (1980)	"Gentlemen Take Polaroids" (1980)

Japan singles chronology
"Life in Tokyo" (1981)	"Quiet Life" (1981)	"Visions of China" (1981)

"Quiet Life" is a song by the British new wave band Japan. It is the title track of their 1979 album Quiet Life. The lyrics to the song refer to the problems the band was going through at the time. They had lost their US record contract and Hansa Records had been pressuring them for a hit single in the UK.

"Quiet Life" was first released as a single in Japan in December 1979 with the B-side "Halloween". In March 1980, it was released in Germany and the Netherlands with the B-side "I Second That Emotion", whereas in the UK "Quiet Life" was released as the B-side of the unsuccessful 1980 release of "I Second That Emotion". Hansa Records reissued the song as a single in August 1981 to promote the band's upcoming compilation album Assemblage. It became a top 20 hit on the UK Singles Chart, peaking at number 19 in October 1981 for 2 weeks, and led to the band's first appearance on Top of the Pops.

== Track listings ==
7": Ariola / AHA 1013 (1979, Japan)

1. "Quiet Life" – 4:14
2. "Halloween" – 4:24

7": Hansa (1980, Germany and the Netherlands)

1. "Quiet Life" – 3:51
2. "Second That Emotion" – 3:46

7" B-side: Ariola / AHA 559 (1980, UK)

1. "Second That Emotion" – 3:46
2. "Quiet Life" – 3:51

7": Hansa / HANSA 6 (1981, UK)

1. "Quiet Life" – 3:34
2. "A Foreign Place" – 3:11

12" Hansa / HANSA 12-6 (1981, UK)

1. "Quiet Life" (Extended Version) – 4:50
2. "A Foreign Place" – 3:11
3. "Fall in Love With Me" – 4:30

== Charts ==
Chart (1981)	Peak position
UK Singles (Official Charts)	19
