= Obscure Alternatives =

Studio album by Japan
- Released: 27 October 1978
- Recorded: Summer 1978
- Genres: New wave; post-punk
- Length: 41:17
- Label: Hansa
- Producer: Ray Singer

Japan chronology
Adolescent Sex (1978)	Obscure Alternatives (1978)	Quiet Life (1979)

Singles from Obscure Alternatives
- 1. "Sometimes I Feel So Low" Released: 13 October 1978; 2. "Deviation" Released: March 1979 (Netherlands)

Obscure Alternatives is the second studio album by English new wave band Japan, released in October 1978 by record label Hansa.

== Background ==
Japan's first album, Adolescent Sex, had been unsuccessful on the British charts, and their record company required another album, this time aimed at the lucrative US and European markets where rock was dominating the airwaves. Still working with Ray Singer as producer, singer and songwriter David Sylvian in particular found it difficult to take a back seat and began to demand more control over the eventual presentation of the material. The band's response was to record Obscure Alternatives in 10 days, most definitely a rock album, but one with a twist, as Japan gained the courage to assert themselves as artists and individuals. The crucial track concerned was "The Tenant", a very important piece for Japan as it changed their direction. Taken as a whole Obscure Alternatives is a pivotal work as it bridges two phases of the group. The order of the tracks was very important and intentional. The first half featured material that was mostly part of the group's live show including "Love is Infectious" which was written prior to their debut album. The second includes newer material, displaying greater maturity both lyrically and in arrangement. The title track "Obscure Alternatives", was a feature of their live set until 1981; its arrangement became more and more abstract tour after tour. On the album, it is slow and brooding building to a climax as Sylvian literally screams in anger at the situation he was in. Also notable is "...Rhodesia", again performed live in 1981. With its solid reggae groove and Sylvian beginning to use the lower range of his voice in places. His deeper voice also appeared on "Deviation", a single in Europe, and "Suburban Berlin". The album still included some pop material as "Automatic Gun" and the single "Sometimes I Feel So Low". It was appropriate that "The Tenant" ends the album, as it closes a chapter in the groups career. Japan were emerging as recording artists, as opposed being rock stars. The following chapter was their third album Quiet Life.

== Content ==
Trouser Press wrote that the album "adds more keyboards but still relies on Rob Dean's buzzing guitars and David Sylvian's sneery vocals for its sound". Certain tracks contain elements of funk and reggae. AllMusic's Amy Hanson described "Automatic Gun" as "a spit-shined punk shocker backed by bright pop guitar". The title track is described as "wonderfully atmospheric and slightly menacing", while "Love Is Infectious" "put the band completely into discordant post-punk art house-dom". "....Rhodesia", Hanson writes, "brought the funk back and infused it with a Caribbean essence.

The final track, "The Tenant", a piano based instrumental, was the first notable shift towards the direction their later material would take. "The Tenant" also marks bassist Mick Karn's recording debut on saxophone.

== Release ==
Obscure Alternatives was released in October 1978, only seven months after Adolescent Sex. As with the first album, Obscure Alternatives was commercially unsuccessful in the UK, but garnered moderate success in Japan, where it peaked just outside the Top 20.

The tracks "Deviation" and "Sometimes I Feel So Low" were released as singles in certain countries, the latter as a double A-side with a re-recorded version of "Adolescent Sex" (the title track of their first album, re-recorded during the sessions for this album). It became Japan's first European hit single, and the re-recorded version of "Adolescent Sex" is featured on the 1981 compilation album Assemblage. Both tracks were mixed together to form "I Can't Wait", which was club hit for L'il Devious in 2003.

The album was remastered and re-released in 2004, and included a video for "Sometimes I Feel So Low".

== Reception ==
Professional ratings
Review scores
Source	Rating
AllMusic	3/5 stars
The Encyclopedia of Popular Music	2/5 stars
MusicHound Rock: The Essential Album Guide	2/5 stars

Trouser Press' review was unfavourable, writing: "The songs are fairly unmelodic, the production nondescript. With a quick listen, you might mistake this for a junior-league Stones imitation."

AllMusic was more positive, writing retrospectively: "Although the set isn't quite up to par with its predecessor, Obscure Alternatives is still a challenging listen."

Sylvian has gone on record saying that Obscure Alternatives would have been a better debut album than Adolescent Sex was.

== Track listing ==
All tracks are written by David Sylvian.

Side one
No.	Title	Length
1.	"Automatic Gun"	4:07
2.	"... Rhodesia"	6:48
3.	"Love Is Infectious"	4:10
4.	"Sometimes I Feel So Low"	3:46

Side two
No.	Title	Length
5.	"Obscure Alternatives"	6:50
6.	"Deviation"	3:23
7.	"Suburban Berlin"	4:59
8.	"The Tenant"	7:14
Total length:		41:17

2004 remaster CD bonus tracks
No.	Title	Length
9.	"Deviation (Live)"	3:20
10.	"Obscure Alternatives (Live)"	6:05
11.	"In Vogue (Live)"	6:12
12.	"Sometimes I Feel So Low (Live)"	4:06
13.	"Sometimes I Feel So Low" (video)

== Personnel ==
Japan

- David Sylvian – lead vocals, guitar, mixing
- Rob Dean – guitar, backing vocals, mixing
- Richard Barbieri – synthesizer, keyboards, mixing
- Mick Karn – bass, backing vocals, saxophone, mixing
- Steve Jansen – drums, backing vocals, percussion, mixing

Additional personnel

- Ray Singer – production, mixing
- Chris Tsangarides – engineer, mixing
- Ian Cooper – mastering
- Fin Costello – sleeve photography

== Charts ==
Chart (1978–79)	Peak position
Dutch Albums (Album Top 100)	41
Japanese Albums (Oricon)	21
