= Gentlemen Take Polaroids =

Studio album by Japan
- Released: 7 November 1980
- Recorded: 2 July – 2 October 1980
- Studios: AIR (London); Townhouse (London); The Barge (London)
- Genres: Avant-pop; synth-pop; electropop; eurodisco
- Length: 46:26
- Label: Virgin
- Producer: John Punter

Japan chronology
| Quiet Life (1979) | Gentlemen Take Polaroids (1980) | Tin Drum (1981) |

Singles from Gentlemen Take Polaroids
- 1. "Gentlemen Take Polaroids" Released: 10 October 1980; 2. "Nightporter" Released: 12 November 1982

Alternative cover

Gentlemen Take Polaroids is the fourth studio album by the English new wave band Japan, released on 7 November 1980 by Virgin Records. It was certified gold in the UK and reached number 51 in the UK Album Charts.

== Background ==
Gentlemen Take Polaroids was the band's first album for the Virgin Records label after leaving Hansa-Ariola, which had released their first three albums. It continued in the vein of their previous album Quiet Life, drawing on its elegant Euro-disco stylings coupled with more ambitious arrangements. In a 1982 interview, frontman and songwriter David Sylvian commented that by the time of this album, he had become a "paranoid perfectionist" and that he had come to dominate the band's recording sessions, forcing the other members to comply with his vision which ultimately led to the band's break up – a situation he took some responsibility for (he considers 1979's Quiet Life to be the only album which the band worked on in a truly collaborative manner). This was the last Japan album to feature guitarist Rob Dean, who left the band in spring 1981. Dean took little part in the recording of the album and was only occasionally called in by the band to add guitar.

Lyrically the songs were also a continuation of themes on the previous album, such as travel and escape to foreign climes in the song "Swing", while the lyrics of "Nightporter" introduced a more introspective nature of Sylvian's songwriting. "Taking Islands in Africa", the title of which was taken from a line in "Swing", was a collaboration with Ryuichi Sakamoto, who was given a songwriting credit for the track.

The album was completed in two months. The band and producer John Punter worked meticulously on the arrangements with multiple takes on each instrument and the master edited from different takes. Some of the songs such as "My New Career" and "Taking Islands in Africa" were written in the studio.

There was an unreleased song still sitting in the vaults from the sessions for this album; "Some Kind of Fool" (which Sylvian re-recorded the vocals for and released on Everything and Nothing). Rob Dean remembers in an interview by Chi Ming Lai and Paul Boddy 2019:

Ann O'Dell's strings were added and it was at that point that David decided not to pursue recording it further, the main reason being I believe, that with the strings, it began to resemble "The Other Side of Life" too closely arrangement-wise which actually I can see was a very valid point. Ironically the JAPAN version with a couple of embellishments and a re-recorded vocal eventually found its way onto the Sylvian compilation "Everything and Nothing" but under his name alone, rather unfairly. Surprisingly, the guitar parts which I struggled over remain intact too. Anyone listening to this is essentially listening to an updated version of the original JAPAN band version.

At the beginning of the recording sessions the band also rehearsed an unfinished song called "Angel in Furs", but it is unclear if a recording exists. The guitar melody of the song is said to have been used as the vocal melody of "My New Career".

== Release ==
The album was preceded by the release of the title track as a single in October 1980, which peaked at number 60 in the UK singles chart, the group's first single to chart.

The album itself was moderately successful in the UK on its release. It peaked at number 51, but re-entered the chart in 1982 and was later certified gold by the British Phonographic Industry in 1986 for 100,000 copies sold.

No further singles were immediately taken from the album, though "Nightporter" (influenced by the works of French composer Erik Satie, most particularly his Gymnopedies) was remixed and released as a single in November 1982, just after the band announced that they were breaking up. It peaked at number 29 in the UK singles chart, though both the edited 7-inch version and the full-length 12-inch remix remain unreleased on CD to this day.

The album was reissued in 2003, with slightly different cover art (taken from the same photo session as the original cover) and three bonus tracks; the instrumentals "The Width of a Room" (the only track in the band's catalogue composed by guitarist Rob Dean) and "The Experience of Swimming", composed by Richard Barbieri. Both tracks were originally B-sides to the "Gentlemen Take Polaroids" double 7-inch single, but were also used on later singles. The third bonus track was "Taking Islands in Africa", a Steve Nye-remixed version from 1981 originally released as the B-side of the "Visions of China" 7-inch single.

On 24 August 2018, two new half-speed-mastered vinyl pressings were released; a single 33 rpm version and a deluxe double 45 rpm version, both mastered by Miles Showell at Abbey Road Studios. For the first time all lyrics were printed inside the gatefold of the deluxe version and the cover art had cropped the band name and title with the original photograph now covering the whole surface.

== Reception ==
Professional ratings
Review scores
| Source | Rating |
|---|---|
| AllMusic | 4/5 stars |
| The Encyclopedia of Popular Music | 3/5 stars |
| The Guardian | 3/5 stars |
| Record Mirror | 2.5/5 stars |
| Smash Hits | 8/10 |
| Uncut | 3/5 stars |

Gentlemen Take Polaroids received mixed reviews on its release. Writing in Smash Hits magazine in November 1980, Steve Taylor gave the album an 8 out of 10 rating and said: "If Brian Eno, rather than Bryan Ferry, had rerouted the original direction of Roxy Music, this might well have been the result..."

However, other contemporary critics were unimpressed. NME's Paul Du Noyer and Melody Maker's Patrick Humphries both saw Japan as Roxy Music imitators. Du Noyer said: "If only Japan's music was as eloquent as it's elegant... they lavish tender loving care on the surface sound – a beautifully polished, empty shell of a sound." Humphries expressed a similar opinion: "There's something infinitely unsatisfying about this album. From the false image of the band to the hollow songs they perform." Mike Nicholls in Record Mirror also criticized David Sylvian for his "Bryan Ferry fixation". While saying that the album "is not without its reedeeming features. The rhythm section of Mick Karn and Steve Jansen is particular proficient, their disco beats dominating the best songs 'Swing' and 'Methods of Dance'", Nicholls dismissed Japan's "drift towards their new muzak direction" on tracks such as the "disappointingly non-tribal 'Taking Islands in Africa'" and 'Burning Bridges' "which is Bowie's 'Warzawa' to a 'T'", and concluded: "In all, a disappointing album. 'Quiet Life' might have been similarly derivative, but it was at least substantial and an adventurous departure. This is just a patchwork quilt of half-digested influences that will do nothing to solve the group's dilettante image problem."

In his retrospective review, Ned Raggett of AllMusic called it "unquestionably the album in which Japan truly found its own unique voice and aesthetic approach." Joseph Burnett of The Quietus wrote that the album "took the sound of Quiet Life and refined it into a series of oblique, almost cinematic avant-pop creations that exquisitely surround the frontman's woozy post-Bryan Ferry croon in layers of pop textures that sounded like little else by Japan's contemporaries." Trouser Press called it an "excellent" album whose "technically exquisite and musically adventurous sound is loaded with atmosphere, yet displays a very light touch."

The title track impressed Gary Numan, who hired Mick Karn and Rob Dean to play on his 1981 album Dance and later named a chapter in his autobiography after the song. It was popular with club DJs: Nick Rhodes of Duran Duran regularly played the track at the Rum Runner, and Rusty Egan of Visage played it at the Blitz.

== Track listing ==
All tracks are written by David Sylvian, except as noted.

Side A
| No. | Title | Length |
|---|---|---|
| 1. | "Gentlemen Take Polaroids" | 7:08 |
| 2. | "Swing" | 6:23 |
| 3. | "Burning Bridges†" | 5:23 |
| 4. | "My New Career" | 3:52 |

Side B
| No. | Title | Writer(s) | Length |
|---|---|---|---|
| 5. | "Methods of Dance" | | 6:53 |
| 6. | "Ain't That Peculiar" | Smokey Robinson, Warren "Pete" Moore, Marvin Tarplin, Bobby Rogers | 4:40 |
| 7. | "Nightporter" | | 6:57 |
| 8. | "Taking Islands in Africa" | Ryuichi Sakamoto, Sylvian | 5:12 |

† The track "Burning Bridges" was put on the album as a last-minute replacement for a track titled "Some Kind of Fool", with a number of UK and German pressings of the album listing the latter song on the inner sleeve and on the track listings. "Some Kind of Fool" was also going to be released as a single in 1982, but was replaced by "Nightporter". An overdubbed version with new lyrics was released on Sylvian's solo album Everything and Nothing in 2000, but the original Japan version has never been released.

2003 CD reissue bonus tracks
| No. | Title | Writer(s) | Length |
|---|---|---|---|
| 9. | "The Experience of Swimming" | Richard Barbieri | 4:04 |
| 10. | "The Width of a Room" | Rob Dean | 3:14 |
| 11. | "Taking Islands in Africa" (Steve Nye Remix) | | 4:53 |

== Singles ==
| Year | Song | UK Chart | Additional information |
|---|---|---|---|
| 1980 | "Gentlemen Take Polaroids" | 60 | released as a double single pack: "Gentlemen Take Polaroids" (edit)/"The Experience of Swimming" and "The Width of a Room"/"Burning Bridges" (a Sylvian-produced version unavailable elsewhere) |
| 1982 | "Nightporter" | 29 | released edited and remixed with "Ain't That Peculiar" (remix) on the 7-inch single and "Methods of Dance" on the 12-inch single |

== Personnel ==
Japan

- David Sylvian – vocals, synthesizers (ARP Omni, Oberheim OB-X, Minimoog, Roland System 700), piano, electric guitar
- Mick Karn – fretless bass guitar, oboe, saxophone, recorder
- Steve Jansen – drums, synthesizer (Roland System 700, Sequential Circuits Prophet 5), percussion
- Richard Barbieri – synthesizers (Roland System 700, Micromoog, Polymoog, Prophet 5, Oberheim OB-X, Roland Jupiter 4), sequencer, piano
- Rob Dean – guitar, ebow

Additional personnel

- Ryuichi Sakamoto – synthesizers
- Simon House – violin on "My New Career"
- Cyo – vocals on "Methods of Dance"
- Barry Guy – double bass
- Andrew Cauthery – oboe

Technical

- John Punter – production, mixing, recording, engineering
- Colin Fairley – recording, engineering
- Nigel Walker – recording, engineering
- Steve Prestage – recording, engineering
- Nicola Tyson – back cover
- Stuart McLeod – front cover

== Charts ==
| Chart (1980–81) | Peak position |
|---|---|
| Australian Albums (Kent Music Report) | 86 |
| Canada Top Albums/CDs (RPM) | 39 |
| Japanese Albums (Oricon) | 51 |
| UK Albums (Official Charts) | 51 |

== Certifications ==
| Region | Certification | Certified units/sales |
|---|---|---|
| United Kingdom (BPI) | Gold | 100,000^{^} |
^{^} Shipments figures based on certification alone.
