= Richard Barbieri =

English musician (born 1957)

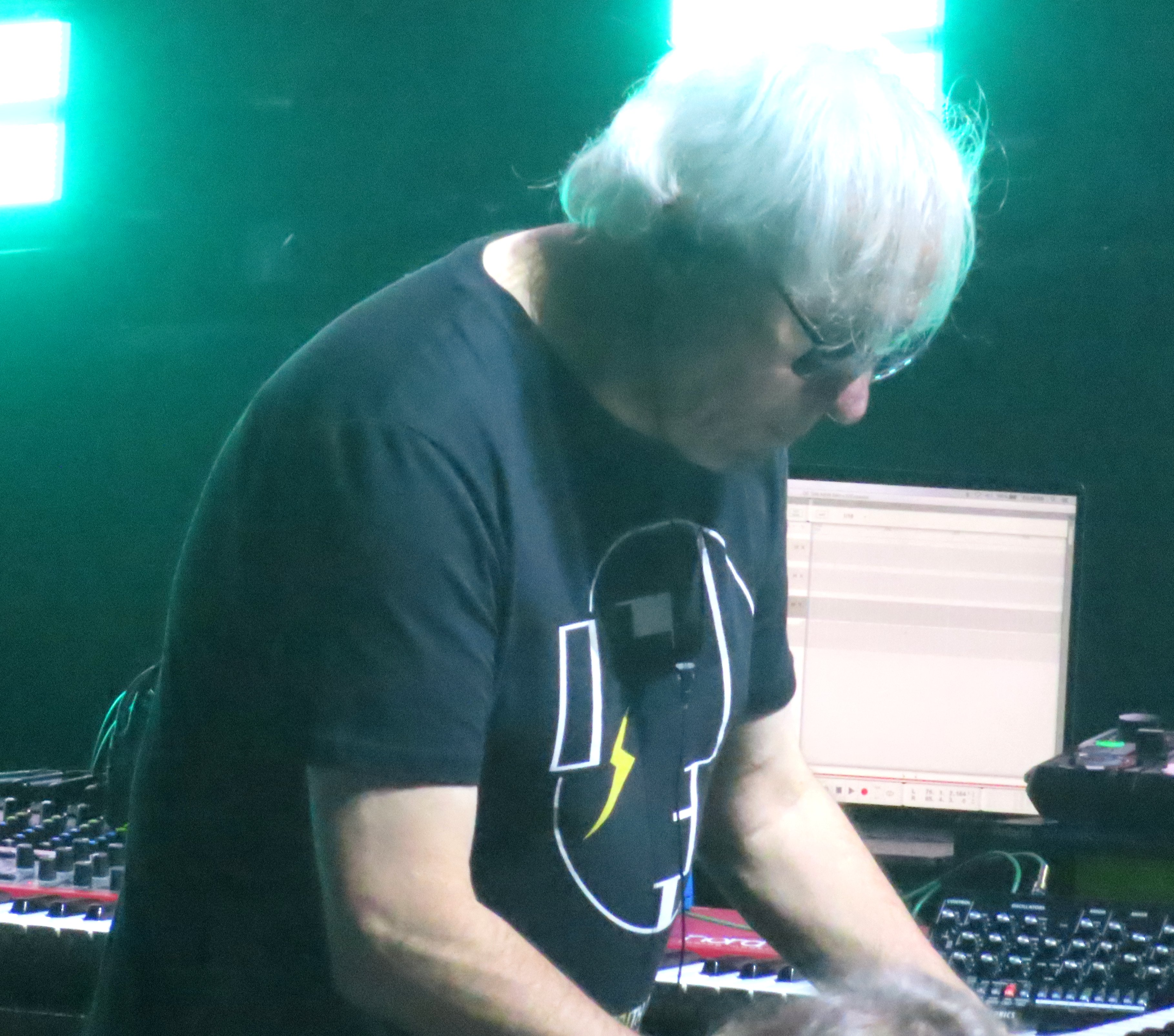
- Barbieri with Porcupine Tree in 2022

Background information
- Born: 30 November 1957 (age 68); London, England
- Genres: Progressive rock; post-punk; art rock; synthpop; new wave; alternative rock
- Occupations: Musician; composer
- Instruments: Keyboards; synthesiser; programming
- Years active: 1974–present
- Member of: Porcupine Tree; Steve Hogarth
- Formerly of: Japan, No-Man, The Dolphin Brothers, JBK, Rain Tree Crow

Richard Barbieri (born 30 November 1957) is an English musician, composer and sound designer. Originally a member of new wave band Japan (and their brief 1989–1991 reincarnation as Rain Tree Crow), he became the keyboard player in the progressive rock band Porcupine Tree in 1993. Besides its founder Steven Wilson, he is the longest tenured member of Porcupine Tree.

== Biography ==
After finishing school in the mid-1970s, Barbieri held a job at a bank for a year before beginning his musical career. His main influence starting out as a keyboardist were Brian Eno, and also the French composer Erik Satie who would both be major influences on his work.

=== Japan (1975–1982) ===
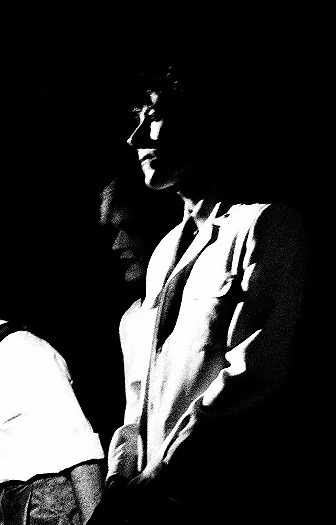
Richard Barbieri taking a curtain call, Hammersmith Odeon November 1982

Barbieri joined his school friends David Sylvian, Mick Karn and Steve Jansen in Catford band Japan in 1975. The band was eventually signed to Hansa Records. While receiving negative reviews and poor sales in Britain, the band initially gained a huge popularity in Japan in the late 1970s. Their greatest artistic and commercial success came with their fifth and final album Tin Drum in 1981, which Barbieri played a central role in producing along with songwriter David Sylvian. Following its release, Barbieri contributed keyboards and programming to Mick Karn's 1982 solo album Titles. Japan split up after a world tour in December 1982.

=== Dolphin Brothers and collaborations (1983–1997) ===
After the break-up of Japan, Barbieri continued his association with David Sylvian, playing on the latter's early solo albums (and on the 1988 in Praise of Shamans tour).

In 1984 he started a long musical association with another Japan colleague, Steve Jansen. This has produced six collaborative albums to date. Under the name The Dolphin Brothers they released the album Catch the Fall in 1987. As Jansen / Barbieri they have released a number of works including Worlds in a Small Room, 1985, Stories Across Borders, 1993, Other Worlds in a Small Room, 1996, and Stone to Flesh, 1997.

=== Rain Tree Crow (1989–1991) ===
In late 1989, the members of Japan (minus guitarist Rob Dean) reunited under the name Rain Tree Crow to make new recordings for Virgin. This resulted in a single eponymous album which extended the work of late Japan and the solo/collective work of all four members, featuring a variety of influences from pop to art rock, jazz, ambient and world music. Other contributors to the album included Bill Nelson. Rain Tree Crow charted in 1991 in the UK Top 25 and brought critical acclaim.

The group parted company shortly after recording the album, for which there was no supporting tour. However, the project was key to the reuniting of Jansen, Barbieri and Karn as a creative unit (sometimes referred to as "JBK").

=== With Alice (1989–1992) ===
Jansen and Barbieri played on many songs of two pivotal albums by the Italian singer Alice, i.e. on all of Il sole nella pioggia and on two songs from Mezzogiorno sulle Alpi, co-written by Barbieri. Other notable players on those albums were Peter Hammill, Gavin Harrison, Jakko Jakszyk, Danny Thompson and Jon Hassell.

=== No-Man (1992) ===
The next work by Jansen, Barbieri and Karn was as the rhythm section for British art-pop band No-Man, who recruited them for a 1992 UK tour and for recordings which later appeared on the Loveblows & Lovecries album and on the Painting Paradise and Sweetheart Raw EPs (one of these EP pieces, the 20-plus-minute Heaven Taste, later appeared on the album of the same name). This marked Barbieri's first work with Steven Wilson, with whom he would then go on to work in Porcupine Tree, and Tim Bowness, with whom he would later record the collaborative album Flame.

=== Medium Productions (1993–2003) ===
In 1993, Barbieri formed the Medium Productions label in 1993 with Jansen and Karn. They commenced with the Jansen/Barbieri/Karn album Beginning to Melt (a collection of varied pieces including some trio work and other recordings featuring various permutations of the basic trio with other collaborators including David Torn and Robbie Aceto). Thirteen diverse albums were released during a ten-year period; Jansen and Barbieri's collaboration with DJ Takemura on the album Changing Hands being one of the highlights.

During this period Barbieri also made two other collaborative albums, one with his wife Suzanne J. Barbieri under the name Indigo Falls (1996), and one with Tim Bowness from the band No-Man titled Flame (1994).

=== Porcupine Tree (1993–2010, 2021–present) ===
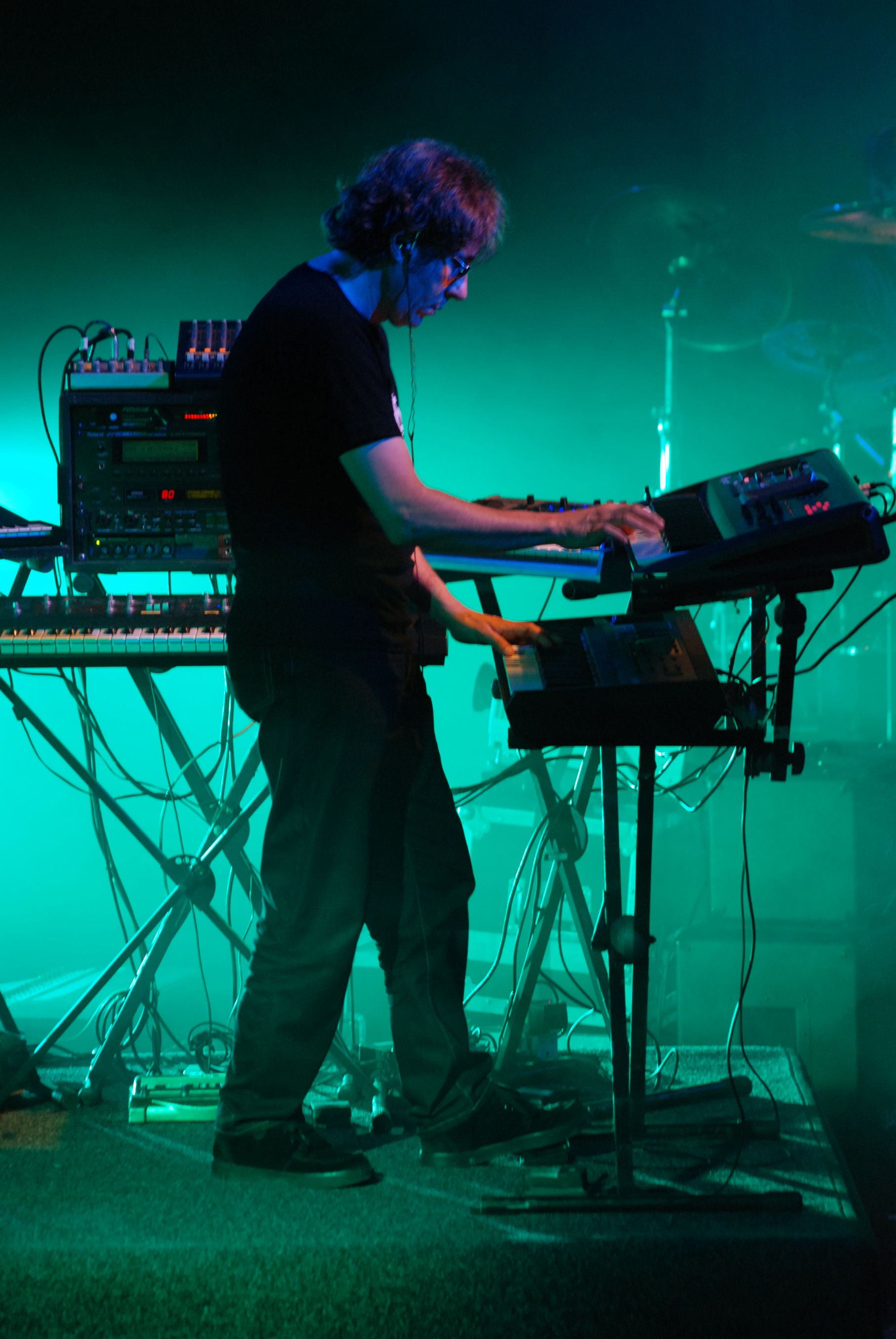
Barbieri in 2007

In late 1993, Barbieri joined the progressive rock band Porcupine Tree (having previously played as a guest performer on the album Up the Downstair). The band released eight studio albums to increasingly greater chart success, and toured in support of many of them. Initially employing many aspects of psychedelic rock, they later transitioned to a more pop-oriented style before settling on progressive metal. Their first major success was the album In Absentia, which enjoyed chart success around Europe with sales of over 120,000. The following studio albums Deadwing and Fear of a Blank Planet met even greater success, charting highly worldwide, and picking up two Grammy Nominations. Increased radio airtime and favourable mainstream magazine reviews and interviews further increased their public exposure. The band transitioned somewhat away from metal with their 2009 album, The Incident, with leader Steven Wilson expressing a desire to enter a different genre. After years of speculation and diffusion of rumors from Wilson, the band announced its reunion in 2021.

=== With Steve Hogarth (2012) ===
Barbieri collaborated with Steve Hogarth on the album Not The Weapon But The Hand, which was released by Kscope Records in 2012, but a proposed tour was cancelled for financial issues. Barbieri wrote the music and Hogarth provided the lyrics for the album.

=== Lustans Lakejer (1982/2017) ===
In 1982, Barbieri produced the album En plats i solen by the Japan-influenced Swedish band Lustans Lakejer. In 2017 he joined them on a Swedish tour to perform the album in its entirety.

=== Solo recordings (2004–present) ===
Barbieri has released five solo albums: Things Buried, 2004/5, Stranger Inside, 2008, Planets + Persona, 2017, Under A Spell, 2021 and Hauntings, 2026. Barbieri also released a series of 5 EP's on cd and vinyl under the title "Variants". These releases featured new compositions, improvisations, live performances and reworkings of older material.

== Other activities ==
Besides recording and touring, Barbieri has written articles on analogue synthesis for various publications and programs for music software and synthesizer manufacturers. He has guested many times with The Bays, an electronic improvisational group. Recent work with The Bays includes two BBC Radio 1 sessions for the late John Peel and concerts at the Queen Elizabeth Hall and Brighton Dome. Richard and The Bays performed an improvised soundtrack to Run Lola Run in Darling Harbour, Sydney, in 2009. He also undertakes occasional keyboards duties for the live outings of Marillion vocalist Steve Hogarth's fronted H-Band, appearing on the 2002 album Live Body, Live Spirit.

== Discography ==
=== with Japan ===
- 1978 – Adolescent Sex (Hansa Records)
- 1978 – Obscure Alternatives (Hansa Records)
- 1979 – Quiet Life (Hansa Records)
- 1980 – Gentlemen Take Polaroids (Virgin records)
- 1981 – Tin Drum (Virgin Records)
- 1981 – Assemblage (compilation) (Hansa Records)
- 1983 – Oil on Canvas (live album) (Virgin Records)
- 1984 – Exorcising Ghosts (compilation) (Virgin Records)

=== with Rain Tree Crow ===
- 1991 – Rain Tree Crow (Virgin Records)

=== with Jansen/Barbieri ===
- 1985 – Worlds in a Small Room (Pan East (UK) / JVC Victor (Japan))
- 1991 – Stories Across Borders (Venture / Virgin)
- 1995 – Stone To Flesh (Medium Productions)
- 1996 – Other Worlds in a Small Room (Medium Productions)
- 2015 - Lumen (Kscope) (Recorded in 1996)

=== with Alice ===
- 1989 – Il sole nella pioggia
- 1992 – Mezzogiorno sulle Alpi

=== with Jansen/Barbieri/Karn ===
- 1994 – Beginning to Melt (Medium Productions)
- 1994 – Seed (Medium Productions)
- 1999 – ISM (Polydor / Medium)
- 2001 – Playing in a Room with People (Medium Productions)

=== with The Dolphin Brothers ===
- 1987 – Catch the Fall (Virgin Records)
- 1987 – Face To Face (Japanese T.V.C.M. 7" single) (Virgin Records)

(Also included on Virgin Japan CD release of Catch The Fall)

=== with Jansen/Barbieri/Takemura ===
- 1997 – Changing Hands (Medium Productions)

=== with Indigo Falls ===
- 1996 – (Richard Barbieri/Suzanne Barbieri) (Medium Productions)

=== as Richard Barbieri/Tim Bowness ===
- 1994 – Flame (One Little Indian)

=== with Barbieri/Roedelius/Chianura ===
- 2001 – T'AI (Auditorium)

=== with Steve Hogarth/Richard Barbieri ===
- 2012 – Not The Weapon But The Hand (K Scope)
- 2014 – Arc Light (Racket Records)

=== Richard Barbieri ===
- 2005 – Things Buried (Intact Records)
- 2008 – Stranger Inside (K-Scope/Snapper)
- 2017 - Planets + Persona (K Scope)
- 2017 - Variants.1 (K Scope)
- 2018 - Variants.2 (K Scope)
- 2018 - Variants.3 (K Scope)
- 2018 - Variants.4 (K Scope)
- 2018 - Variants.5 (K Scope)
- 2020 - Past Imperfect / Future Tense (Bandcamp/Orange Asylum Records)
- 2021 - Under a Spell (K Scope)
- 2021 - On High (Bandcamp/Orange Asylum Records)
- 2026 - Hauntings (K Scope)

=== with Porcupine Tree ===
- 1993 – Up the Downstair (Delerium Records)
- 1995 – The Sky Moves Sideways (Delerium Records)
- 1996 – Signify* (Delerium Records)
- 1997 – Coma Divine (Delerium Records)
- 1998 – Metanoia* (Delerium Records)
- 1999 – Stupid Dream* (Snapper Records)
- 2000 – Voyage 34: The Complete Trip* (Snapper Records)
- 2000 – Lightbulb Sun* (Snapper Records)
- 2001 – Recordings* (Snapper Records)
- 2002 – Stars Die: The Delerium Years 1991-1997 (Snapper Records)
- 2002 – In Absentia* (Lava / Warner)
- 2005 – Deadwing* (Lava / Warner)
- 2007 – Fear of a Blank Planet* (Roadrunner / Warner)
- 2007 – Nil Recurring* EP (Peaceville Records)
- 2009 – The Incident* (Roadrunner / Warner)
- 2022 - Closure/Continuation* (Music for Nations)
- Albums marked with an (*) include Barbieri compositions

=== As producer ===
- 1982 Lustans Lakejer – En Plats I Solen (Stranded / Polar Records) (Sweden). In 2017, he joined them on a Swedish tour to perform the album in its entirety.
- 1983 Akira Mitake – Out Of Reach (Epic/Sony Records) (Japan)
- 1985 Die Werkpiloten – Faith (Dean/Ariola Records) (Germany)
- 2003 Adom - Idiot Savant (Storm Records/Universal) (UK)
- 2009 - Endless (with Stefano Panunzi, Nicola Lori, Mick Karn, Gavin Harrison, Tim Bowness) (Forward Music Italy)
