= Steve Jansen =

English musician, composer and producer (born 1959)

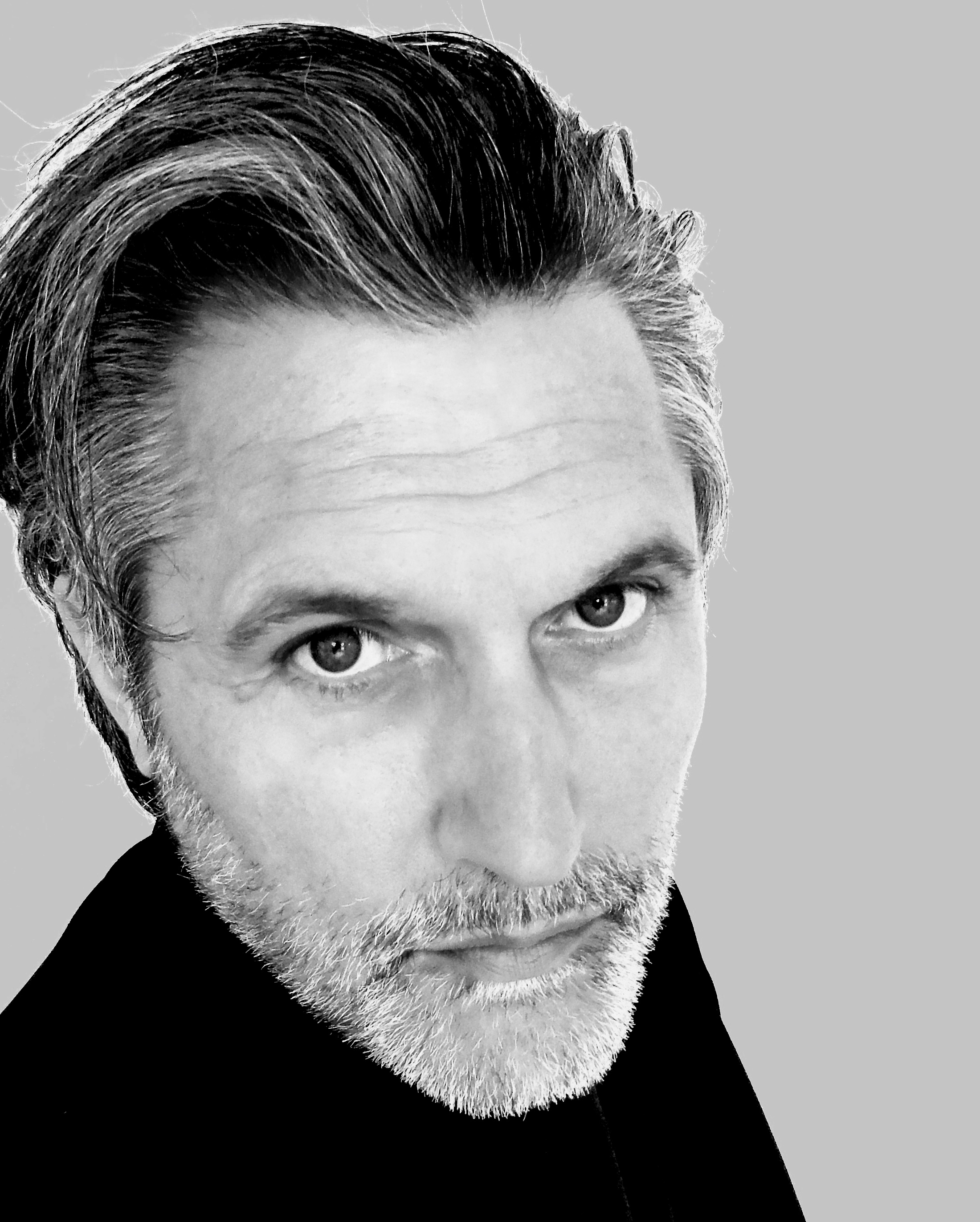
- Jansen in 2017

Background information
- Born: Stephen Ian Batt; 1 December 1959 (age 66)
- Origin: Sydenham, London, England
- Genres: New wave; electronic rock; electropop; art pop; experimental pop; pop rock; art rock; experimental rock
- Occupations: Musician; composer; record producer
- Instruments: Drums; electronic percussion; keyboards; sampler
- Years active: 1974–present
- Labels: Medium Productions; Samadhi Sound; Kscope
- Member of: Exit North
- Formerly of: Japan; The Dolphin Brothers; Rain Tree Crow; Jansen Barbieri Karn (JBK); Nine Horses
- Website: stevejansen.net
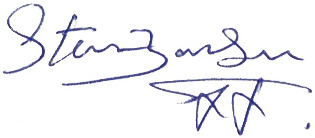
- Steve Jansen's signature (c. 1980)

Steve Jansen (born Stephen Ian Batt; 1 December 1959) is an English musician, composer and record producer.

== Biography ==
Jansen was a founding member of the band Japan, along with his brother David Sylvian (vocals, guitars and keyboards) and Mick Karn (bass guitar), having met in Catford. Japan began as an amateur band in 1974, and the trio were later joined by Richard Barbieri (keyboards) and Rob Dean (guitar). Their first studio album, titled Adolescent Sex, was released in 1978, followed by Obscure Alternatives the same year. Both albums saw polarized reviews and poor sales domestically in the UK, but were commercially successful overseas. The band's third album Quiet Life marked a significant departure from their original alternative glam rock style, with the change in sound causing them to be associated with the New Romantic movement by critics, though this was repeatedly rejected by the members themselves. Virgin Records released Japan's final studio albums, Gentlemen Take Polaroids and Tin Drum, and the band's last live performance was on 16 December 1982. Japan suffered from personal and creative clashes and decided to split during a period when they were beginning to experience significant commercial success both in their native UK and internationally. The band briefly reunited in 1991 under the name Rain Tree Crow and released a self-titled album.

After Japan's break up, Jansen recorded with bandmate Richard Barbieri under the name Jansen/Barbieri and released an instrumental album Worlds in a Small Room and later (Catch the Fall) as the Dolphin Brothers, with Jansen handling lead vocals as well as drums and percussion.

In 1991, Jansen, Barbieri, and Karn formed Medium Productions as a venue for releasing their own music, as well as releases by other artists.

Jansen has worked as a session musician and in collaboration with a wide range of international artists, such as Yukihiro Takahashi and Italian singer-songwriter Alice. He collaborated with David Sylvian and Burnt Friedman on the Nine Horses project, which has generated one album and one extended play CD released through Sylvian's record label Samadhi Sound. Jansen performed with Sylvian during his live tours, playing drums and percussion.

He released his first solo album, titled Slope, in 2007. Regarding the creative process behind the album, Jansen stated that he "approached composition attempting to avoid chord and song structures and the usual familiar building blocks. Instead I wanted to piece together unrelated sounds, music samples, rhythms and 'events' in an attempt to deviate from my own trappings as a musician." The album was released on Samadhi Sound, and features Sylvian in a "bluesy" duet with Joan Wasser, and contributions by Anja Garbarek, Sweet Billy Pilgrim, Thomas Feiner and Nina Kinert. On 15 April 2016, Jansen released a second solo album via Bandcamp and other digital music retailers, titled Tender Extinction.

Jansen has continued to work on new compositions, some of which he has released as standalone tracks, and continues to be in demand as a producer and collaborator, working with musicians across a range of genres. A recent re-release of the 1995 Jansen/Barbieri album Stone to Flesh includes a new track titled "Map of Falling", composed by the two musicians in 2015.

During his time with Japan, Jansen dabbled in photography, documenting the band and their transient lifestyle. He held small-scale photographic exhibitions in Tokyo and London during 1982 and 1983, respectively. A selection of these images are available on Jansen's website. He released a book of his photography in October 2015, titled Through a Quiet Window, through the Japanese publisher Artes Publishing.

Jansen maintained a Tumblr blog under the username of "Sleepyard" as an additional avenue to publish his photography and answer fan questions, but wrote a post in April 2016 stating that he would no longer maintain it, citing his displeasure with the platform as a whole. Later in the same month, Jansen re-launched his blog through WordPress.

In 2014, Jansen formed a new musical project, Exit North, with three Swedish musicians: Charlie Storm, Ulf Jansson and Thomas Feiner. They worked together in Charlie Storm's studio in Gothenburg, and the album was released on 1 October 2018, called Book of Romance and Dust. Exit North played live in Tokyo, Japan, on 27 September 2019. In 2020, Exit North released a new single, Let the Hearts Desire. Their second album, Anyway, Still, was released on 14 April 2023.

== Views ==
Jansen is an atheist and describes astrology as "almost as bonkers as religion".

== Discography ==
=== Solo albums ===
- 2007 – Slope (Samadhi Sound)
- 2016 – Tender Extinction
- 2017 – The Extinct Suite
- 2018 – Corridor
- 2022 – Neither Present nor Absent

=== with Japan ===
- 1978 – Adolescent Sex (Hansa Records)
- 1978 – Obscure Alternatives (Hansa Records)
- 1979 – Quiet Life (Hansa Records)
- 1980 – Gentlemen Take Polaroids (Virgin Records)
- 1981 – Tin Drum (Virgin Records)
- 1981 – Assemblage (compilation; Hansa Records)
- 1983 – Oil on Canvas (live album; Virgin Records)
- 1984 – Exorcising Ghosts (compilation; Virgin Records)

=== with Rain Tree Crow ===
- 1991 – Rain Tree Crow (Virgin Records)

=== with Jansen/Barbieri ===
- 1985 – Worlds in a Small Room (Pan East (UK) / JVC Victor (Japan))
- 1991 – Stories Across Borders (Venture / Virgin)
- 1995 – Stone To Flesh (Medium Productions)
- 1996 – Other Worlds in a Small Room (Medium Productions)
- 2015 - Lumen (KScope)
- 2015 - Stone To Flesh (KScope; re-mastered with additional track "Map of Falling")

=== with Jansen/Barbieri/Karn ===
- 1993 – Beginning to Melt (Medium Productions)
- 1994 – Seed (Medium Productions)
- 1999 – ISM (Polydor / Medium)
- 2001 – Playing in a Room with People (Medium Productions)

=== with The Dolphin Brothers ===
- 1987 – Catch the Fall (Virgin Records)
- 1987 – "Face To Face" (Japanese T.V.C.M. 7" single) (Virgin Records; also included on Virgin Japan CD release of Catch The Fall)

=== with Jansen/Barbieri/Takemura ===
- 1997 – Changing Hands (Medium Productions)

=== with Nine Horses ===
- 2005 – Snow Borne Sorrow (Samadhi Sound)
- 2007 – Money for All (Samadhi Sound)

=== with Yukihiro Takahashi ===
- 1986 - Stay Close/Betsu-Ni (non-LP 3-track 12-inch EP)
- 1997 - PulseXPulse
- 1998 - Pulse Remix

(also appears as guest drummer on several Takahashi releases)

=== with D'Agostino/Foxx/Jansen ===
- 2009 - A Secret Life

=== with Exit North ===
- 2018 - Book of Romance and Dust
- 2023 - Anyway, Still

=== with David Sylvian ===
- 1984 - Brilliant Trees
- 1985 - Alchemy: An Index of Possibilities
- 1986 - Gone to Earth
- 1987 - Secrets of the Beehive
- 1999 - Dead Bees on a Cake

=== with No-Man ===
- 2001- Returning Jesus

=== with Perry Blake ===
- 1999 - Still Life
