= Tin Drum (album) =

Studio album by Japan
- Released: 13 November 1981
- Recorded: June – September 1981
- Studios: The Manor, Shipton-on-Cherwell; Odyssey, London; Regents Park, London; AIR, London
- Genres: Art pop; new wave; post-punk; avant-pop; synth-pop; art rock; electronica
- Length: 38:14
- Label: Virgin
- Producers: Steve Nye; Japan; John Punter (Note: Although uncredited, the album version of "The Art of Parties" kept parts of the original Punter-produced version, including the rhythm guitars)

Japan chronology
Gentlemen Take Polaroids (1980)	Tin Drum (1981)	Oil on Canvas (1983)

Singles from Tin Drum
- 1. "The Art of Parties" Released: 1 May 1981; 2. "Visions of China" Released: 30 October 1981; 3. "Ghosts" Released: 12 March 1982; 4. "Cantonese Boy" Released: 13 May 1982

Tin Drum is the fifth and final studio album by the English new wave band Japan, released on 13 November 1981 by Virgin Records. It peaked at No. 12 on the UK Albums Chart, and featured the top 5 single "Ghosts". It has received acclaim as the band's best and most original work.

== Music and lyrics ==
Tin Drum continued the band's now-established mix of electronic elements with traditional instrumentation, but leans far more towards Far Eastern influences than any of their previous albums. Lead guitarist Rob Dean had departed in May 1981 and vocalist/songwriter/second guitarist David Sylvian had taken on his duties, which had been very greatly reduced by the band's change of musical direction. Brooklyn Rail writer Paul Grimstad described the album's sound as "mannered cubist pop".

Musically, Tin Drum was a meticulously crafted blend of complex rhythms, keyboard textures, and Mick Karn's bass playing. Keyboardist Richard Barbieri recalled that recording the album "was a very laborious process, but creatively satisfying(...) it was the first album where we actually produced something (...) completely original." Also important for the band finding their own unique sound was their work with Steve Nye, who had replaced John Punter as the band's producer. In a 1982 interview, Sylvian commented that by the making of Tin Drum, Karn had become more preoccupied with his own projects and was not involved as much as he was on previous albums, essentially, in Sylvian's view, becoming little more than a "session musician". Others who remember the recording of the album, however do not share this view of Karn's involvement.

Barbieri remembers this album as 'quite an adventure in synth programming'. Synthesizers used included the Sequential Circuits Prophet-5, an Oberheim OB-X, and a Roland System 700. In addition to drums, Steve Jansen also contributed keyboards and marimba and was given song writing credits together with Sylvian on two tracks. "Sons of Pioneers" was based on the bassline composed by Mick Karn, the first and only song writing credit Karn got on a Japan song.

Lyrically, the songs include notions of romance, melancholia, travel and escape, and particularly David Sylvian's fascination for Eastern culture, which at times ("Visions of China", "Cantonese Boy") have a satirical undercurrent. "Ghosts" was Sylvian's most personal lyric to date, expressing notions of self-doubt, ambiguity, regret, and hope.

== Recording ==
The band began recording the album in June 1981 at The Manor Studio in Oxfordshire, the first tracks to be completed were "Talking Drum", which was initially intended to be the next single, and "Canton" (intended as the B-side), but this release did not occur. The band later moved to two other studios in London, before the album was completed at AIR Studios.

== Release ==
Tin Drum was released on 13 November 1981 by record label Virgin.

Four of the album's eight songs were released as singles in the UK—"The Art of Parties", "Visions of China", "Ghosts", and "Cantonese Boy"—whilst a live version of "Canton" was issued as a single to promote the Oil on Canvas live album in 1983. "The Art of Parties" was released as a single in May 1981, and along with its B-side "Life Without Buildings", had been recorded at Basing Street Studios. However, it was re-recorded for the album. Of all the singles, the most commercially successful was "Ghosts", a minimalist, drum-free song which reached No. 5 in the UK, surprisingly becoming Japan's biggest hit. "Visions of China" reached No. 32 and "Cantonese Boy" reached No. 24. The album itself peaked at No. 12 in the UK, and was certified gold by the British Phonographic Industry in 1982.

In 2000 Sylvian re-recorded "Ghosts", using the original Japan backing track, and this version was included on his compilation albums Everything and Nothing (2000) and A Victim of Stars 1982–2012 (2012).

Tin Drum was reissued on CD in 2003 as a deluxe box set containing a six-panel digipak housing the remastered original CD with original cover art, a gatefold sleeved "The Art of Parties" CD, and a 24-page booklet with pictures of the band. A budget single-CD version was later released.

On 24 August 2018, two new half speed-mastered vinyl pressings were released: a single 33 rpm version and a deluxe double 45 rpm version. Both were mastered by Miles Showell at Abbey Road Studios. For the first time, all lyrics were printed inside the gatefold sleeve of the deluxe album.

== Critical reception ==
Professional ratings
Review scores
Source	Rating
AllMusic	4.5/5 stars
Blender	3/5 stars
The Encyclopedia of Popular Music	4/5 stars
The Great Rock Discography	9/10
The Guardian	4/5 stars
Record Mirror	4/5 stars
Smash Hits	8/10
Uncut	4/5 stars

With Tin Drum, Japan received some of the best reviews of their career in the contemporary British music press. NME's Paul Morley wrote of the album: "Gorgeously erotic, perfectly evanescent. It accepts transitoriness, yet delights in sensation." Morley also praised the album as a "triumph" for David Sylvian in particular, "the sensitive individual, the deep feeling loner, his voice stricken on the tensions between confidence and gloom, whose lyrics are a questing expression of love and loss, doubt and despondency. His old clumsiness at describing his position, at probing his passion has been replaced with a sublime simplicity." In Smash Hits, critic David Bostock proclaimed that "Japan have made their best album yet." Record Mirror writer Suzie said that while she still found Sylvian's vocals "mannered and... far too close to Bryan Ferry for comfort", Tin Drum is "a very accomplished musical exercise."In 1986, Sounds ranked it number 22 on their top 100 greatest albums of all time, while also ranking "Visions of China" number 87 in their list of top 100 songs of all time.

However, Melody Maker's Lynne Barber was less impressed: "The music slots together in jigsaw fashion, leaving plenty of space and clean air... but there seems to be little purpose to their constructs, a dearth of aesthetic sensibility. Japan's music is pre-fabricated, built from an architect's well-laid plan, yet not sculpted with an artist's passion or insight."

Joseph Burnett of The Quietus described Tin Drum in 2013 as "unique in pop history, a fearlessly ambitious, unusual and conceptual work of art that defies genre categorisation." In a retrospective review, AllMusic critic Ned Raggett called it Japan's "most unique, challenging, and striking album". Trouser Press wrote that Tin Drum "presents Japan at peak form".

== Influence and legacy ==
Roland Orzabal of the band Tears for Fears called Tin Drum "an absolute conceptual masterpiece from lyrics to artwork... just everything", and has stated that it was a primary influence on Tears for Fears' first album The Hurting. Based on their admiration for the Japan album, the Cure and XTC hired Steve Nye to produce their 1983 releases "The Walk" and Mummer, respectively. Others who consider the album a favourite include Wild Beasts bassist Tom Fleming, who notes its influence on his band's work, particularly their later, synth-oriented material, and author David Keenan. According to Stephin Merritt, "It features electric guitar sounds previously possible only for Adrian Belew; the bass is so fretless it sounds like a moaning sea mammal, the gorgeous drums are so tonal they could be marimbas, the Prophet 5 synthesizer sits quietly in the mix making squiggly noises; and sometimes a violin plays, in a manner previously heard only in Chinese opera."

== Track listing ==
All tracks are written by David Sylvian, except where noted.

Side one
No.	Title	Writer(s)	Length
1.	"The Art of Parties" (re-recorded version)		4:12
2.	"Talking Drum"		3:35
3.	"Ghosts"		4:36
4.	"Canton"	Sylvian, Steve Jansen	5:35

Side two
No.	Title	Writer(s)	Length
5.	"Still Life in Mobile Homes"		5:35
6.	"Visions of China"	Sylvian, Jansen	3:39
7.	"Sons of Pioneers"	Sylvian, Mick Karn	7:09
8.	"Cantonese Boy"		3:51
Total length:			38:14

2003 CD reissue bonus disc
No.	Title	Length
1.	"The Art of Parties" (single version)	6:47
2.	"Life Without Buildings" ("The Art of Parties" single B-side)	6:48
3.	"The Art of Parties" (live)	5:36
4.	"Ghosts" (single version)	4:02

Note: The bonus tracks were included only on the limited edition two-disc version of the album. The single-disc version features no bonus tracks.

== Personnel ==
=== Japan ===
- David Sylvian – vocals, guitar, keyboard, keyboard programming, tapes, cover concept
- Mick Karn – fretless bass guitar, African flute, dida
- Steve Jansen – acoustic drums, electronic drums, keyboard percussion, Linn LM-1 programming ("Still Life In Mobile Homes" and "Cantonese Boy"), angklung ("Canton")
- Richard Barbieri – keyboards, keyboard programming, tapes

=== Guest musicians ===
- Yuka Fujii – backing vocals
- Simon House – violin

=== Technical personnel ===
- Steve Nye – producer, engineering
- Phil Bodger – assistant engineer
- Fin Costello – photography
- Steve Joule – design

== Charts ==
Chart (1981–82)	Peak position
Japanese Albums (Oricon)	38
Norwegian Albums (VG-lista)	16
Swedish Albums (Sverigetopplistan)	33
UK Albums (Official Charts)	12

== Certifications ==
Region	Certification	Certified units/sales
United Kingdom (BPI)	Gold	100,000^{^}
^{^} Shipments figures based on certification alone.
