= John Punter =

English former record producer and recording engineer

John Punter (born 27 January 1949) is an English and Canadian former record producer and recording engineer. He has worked with many bands and musicians, such as Spoons, Japan, Procol Harum, Roxy Music, Bryan Ferry, Re-Flex, Doctors of Madness, Sad Café and Slade. His career in music spanned over 30 years and many different genres. He is now retired from the entertainment business, and ran a small bar in Peterborough, Ontario, Canada. On July 24, 2019, he became a citizen of Canada.

== Selected production, mixing and remixing ==
- Japan - Quiet Life - 1979
- Japan - Gentlemen Take Polaroids - 1980
- Japan - Oil on Canvas - 1983
- Ivan - The Spell
- Johnny Cougar - “I Need a Lover” -1978
- Spoons - Arias & Symphonies, Vertigo Tango
- Bryan Ferry - Let's Stick Together - 1976
- Nazareth - Nazareth - 1970
- Nazareth - 2XS - 1982
- Roxy Music - Country Life - 1974
- Doctors of Madness - Late Night Movies, All Night Brainstorms
- Sad Café - Fanx Ta-Ra - 1977
- Sad Café - Misplaced Ideals - 1978
- Judie Tzuke - Welcome to the Cruise - 1979
- Pseudo Echo - Autumnal Park - 1984
- Savoy Brown - A Step Further - 1969
- Slade - The Amazing Kamikaze Syndrome - 1983
- Slade - Keep Your Hands Off My Power Supply - 1984
- Slade - Rogues Gallery - 1985
- Slade - You Boyz Make Big Noize - 1987
- Re-Flex - The Politics of Dancing, 1983
- Boulevard - Into The Street - 1990
