= Steve Nye =

British record producer, engineer and musician

- Birth name: Stephen Jonathan Nye
- Origin: England
- Occupation: Record producer

Steve Nye is an English record producer for several artists.

== Career ==
Nye started out as a tape op at AIR Studios in London in 1971, where producer Rupert Hine discovered him. There he got into engineering (and later producing) many well-known artists in the music industry, including Stevie Wonder, Roxy Music and Frank Zappa.

His better known work includes artists such as Fleetwood Mac (Penguin in 1973), Bryan Ferry (In Your Mind in 1977), Penguin Cafe Orchestra, XTC (Mummer in 1983), Japan (Tin Drum in 1981), David Sylvian (Brilliant Trees in 1984, Gone to Earth in 1986, Secrets of the Beehive in 1987), Clannad (Macalla in 1985), TM Network (Carol: A Day in a Girl's Life in 1988), Scary Thieves (Scary Thieves in 1984) and Frank Zappa (Joe's Garage).

In addition to engineering and producing, Nye also played keyboards. He was a member of the Penguin Cafe Orchestra from 1976 to 1988. Nye explains:

'The Penguin Cafe Orchestra is a prime example of the side I'm working on, the musical side. It's what I always come back to. It's simple, it's very strong, and I don't really know where its character comes from. We're like a musical family; we're close to each other and we just enjoy playing together.'
