= Canton =

Canton may refer to:

== Administrative divisions ==
- Canton (administrative division), territorial/administrative division in some countries
- Canton of Cartagena, the government of Cartagena during the Cantonalist Rebellion of 1873–1874
- Cantón de Nuevo México, the government of New Mexico during the Rio Arriba Rebellion of 1837
- Township (Canada), known as canton in Canadian French

== Arts and entertainment ==
- Canton (band), an Italian synth pop group
- "Canton" (song) by Japan
- Canton, a fictional town in "Jaynestown", an episode of Firefly

== Design ==
- Canton (building), a corner pilaster
- Canton (flag), an emblem placed in the top left quarter of a flag
- Canton (heraldry), a square or other charge (symbol) occupying the upper left corner of a coat of arms
- Canton porcelain, Chinese ceramic ware

== People ==
- Canton (surname), and list of people with the surname
- Canton Jones, American Christian music/hip-hop artist

== Places ==
=== Belgium ===
- East Cantons, a region of eastern Belgium

=== China ===
- Guangzhou (Canton City), capital of Guangdong Province
- Guangdong (Canton Province), province in southern China
- Pearl River (Canton River), a river in southern China near Guangzhou
- Canton Road, Hong Kong

=== Canada ===
- Canton, Ontario
- Canton, New Brunswick, a community in Drummond Parish, New Brunswick

=== Kiribati ===
- Canton Island

=== Syria ===
- Afrin Canton, a canton in the autonomous Democratic Federation of Northern Syria
- Shahba Canton, a canton in the autonomous Democratic Federation of Northern Syria

=== United States ===
- Canton, Connecticut, town
- Canton, Georgia, city and county seat
- Canton, Illinois, city
- Canton, Indiana, unincorporated community
- Canton, Iowa, unincorporated community
- Canton, Kansas, rural city
- Canton, Maine, town
- Canton, Baltimore, Maryland, neighborhood and park
- Canton, Massachusetts, town in Greater Boston
- Canton, Michigan, suburban township near Detroit
- Canton, Minnesota, rural city
- Canton, Mississippi, city in Jackson metropolitan area
- Canton, Missouri, city
- Canton, Montana, former town now situated under Canyon Ferry Lake
- Canton, New Jersey, township
- Canton, New York, town
- Canton (village), New York
- Canton, North Carolina, town in Asheville metropolitan area
- Canton City, North Dakota, rural city
- Canton, Ohio, the most populous U.S. city of this name
- Canton, Oklahoma, town
- Canton, Pennsylvania, borough
- Canton, South Dakota, city in Sioux Falls metropolitan area
- Canton, Texas, city in Tyler metropolitan area
- Canton, Wisconsin, town
- Canton, Barron County, Wisconsin, unincorporated community
- Canton River (United States), river in Canton, Massachusetts
- Canton Township (disambiguation)
- East Canton, Ohio
- New Canton, Illinois
- New Canton, Virginia
- North Canton, Ohio
- West Canton, North Carolina

=== Wales ===
- Canton, Cardiff, Wales, UK
  - Canton (Cardiff electoral ward)

== Other uses ==
- Canton (1790 EIC ship), an East Indiaman
- Canton (basketball), a 1906–1907 basketball team in Canton, Ohio, US
- Canton (liqueur), a ginger-flavored liqueur
- Canton Fair, a biannual trade fair in Canton (Guangzhou), China
- Canton Electronics, German loudspeaker manufacturer
- Canton Network, public blockchain network developed for financial institutions
- Canton System, a Chinese trade policy from 1757 to 1842
- Canton System (Prussia), a system of recruitment to the Prussian Army, unrelated to the above
- A metonym for the Pro Football Hall of Fame, in Canton, Ohio, US

== See also ==
- Cantonal Rebellion, a rebellion in Spain in 1873–1874
- Cantone (disambiguation)
- Cantoning, the division of soldiers into groups for the purpose of billeting on campaign or to garrison a territory
- Cantonist, sons of Russian conscripts who were educated in special canton schools
- Kanton (disambiguation)
- Pancit canton, a Philippine noodle dish
