= Kanton =

Kanton may refer to:

- The German name used for the Cantons of Switzerland or the Cantons of Prussia
- The Bosnian name used for the Cantons of the Federation of Bosnia and Herzegovina
- A variation of Canton, the old English name for Guangzhou in China
- Kanton Island in Kiribati, Pacific Ocean
- Historical divisions of the Republic of Tatarstan, Russia

== See also ==
- Canton (disambiguation)
