= Canton metropolitan area =

The Canton metropolitan area may refer to:

- The Guangzhou metropolitan area, China
- The Canton, Ohio metropolitan area, United States
- The Canton, Illinois micropolitan area, United States

== See also ==
- Canton (disambiguation)
