= Cantone =

Cantone may refer to:

== Places ==
- Cantons of Switzerland, known in Italian as cantone
- Cantone, Poschiavo, a locality in Poschiavo, Switzerland
- Cantone, Introdacqua, a subdivision of Introdacqua, Abruzzo, Italy
- Cantone, Nerviano, a subdivision of Nerviano, Lombardy, Italy
- Cantone, Stagno Lombardo, a subdivision of Stagno Lombardo, Lombardy, Italy
- Cantone, Gattatico, a subdivision of Gattatico, Reggio Emilia, Italy
- Cantone, Pieve di Cento, a subdivision of Pieve di Cento, Reggio Emilia, Italy
- Cantone, Parrano, a subdivision of Parrano, Ubmria, Italy

== People ==
- Mario Cantone (born 1959), American comedian, writer and actor
- Luigi Cantone (1917–1997), Italian fencer
- Oberto Cantone (16th century), Italian mathematician
- Raffaele Cantone (born 1963), Italian magistrate
- Tiziana Cantone (1983–2016), Italian victim of cyberbullying

== See also ==
- Canton (disambiguation)
- Cantona (disambiguation)
- Cantoni, a surname
