= Cantona =

Cantona may refer to:

== People ==
- Eric Cantona (born 1966), French actor, director, producer, and former footballer
- Joël Cantona (born 1967), French footballer, brother of Eric

== Places ==
- Cantona (archaeological site), a Mesoamerican archaeological site in Mexico

== See also ==
- Semaeopus cantona, a moth species
- Cantone (disambiguation)
