= Canton (surname) =

Canton is a surname. Notable people with the surname include:

- Bruce Dal Canton (1941–2008), American baseball player
- Frank M. Canton (1849–1927), American gunslinger
- Gloria Begué Cantón (1931–2016), Spanish professor, jurist, senator and magistrate
- Isaac Berechiah Canton (fl. 18th century), Italian Talmudist
- John Canton (1718–1772), English physicist
- Mark Canton (born 1949), American film executive and producer
- Neil Canton (born 1948), American film producer
- William Canton (1845–1926), British writer
