= Tang Ying =

Qing dynasty ceramist (1682–1756)

- 唐英
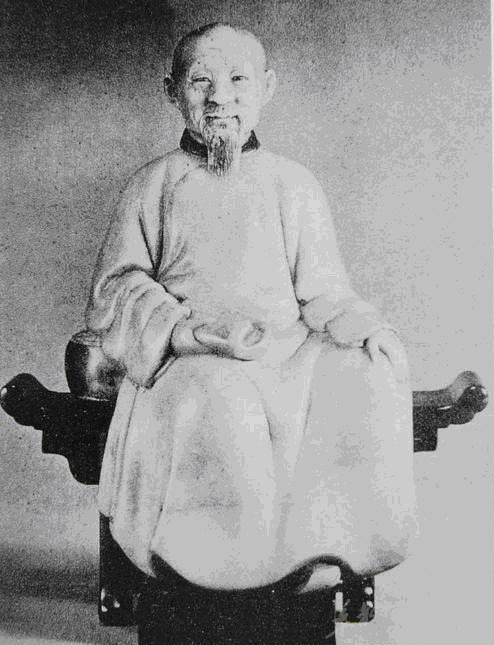
- Sculpted image of Tang Ying
- Born: 1682; Shenyang, Liaoning
- Died: 1756 (aged 73–74)
- Occupations: Government official; Writer; poet; painter; playwright; ceramist

Tang Ying (Chinese: 唐英; 1682–1756) was a Qing dynasty writer, playwright and ceramist. He was the Superintendent of the Imperial porcelain works in Jingdezhen where he served over a period of twenty-eight years under two emperors. His tenure at the Imperial kilns was noted for some of the finest porcelain produced during the Qing dynasty, and the porcelain produced under his supervision is known as Tangyao (唐窯) or Tang ware. He also wrote a number of books on porcelain, as well as 17 plays for kunqu-style regional operas.

== Early life ==
Tang Ying was born on the 5th day of the 5th month in the 21st year of Kangxi reign (1682) in Fengtian (奉天) in today's Shenyang, Liaoning. His great-grandfather Tang Yingzu was a bondservant leader serving in the Plain White Banner of the Han army, therefore he was technically born a bondservant, but he is normally described as a Han Bannerman in Chinese biographies.

Tang entered the service of the Imperial Household Department when he was 16 working as a page. He worked in Yangxin Hall which housed a library of books and paintings; there he acquired a knowledge of art and skill in painting, design and writings. He appeared to know Yongzheng well before he became emperor; in 1723, soon after Yongzheng came to the throne, he was appointed to the position of Vice Director of the Imperial Household Department, acting as foreman for the artisans working in the Imperial workshops.

== Porcelain ==
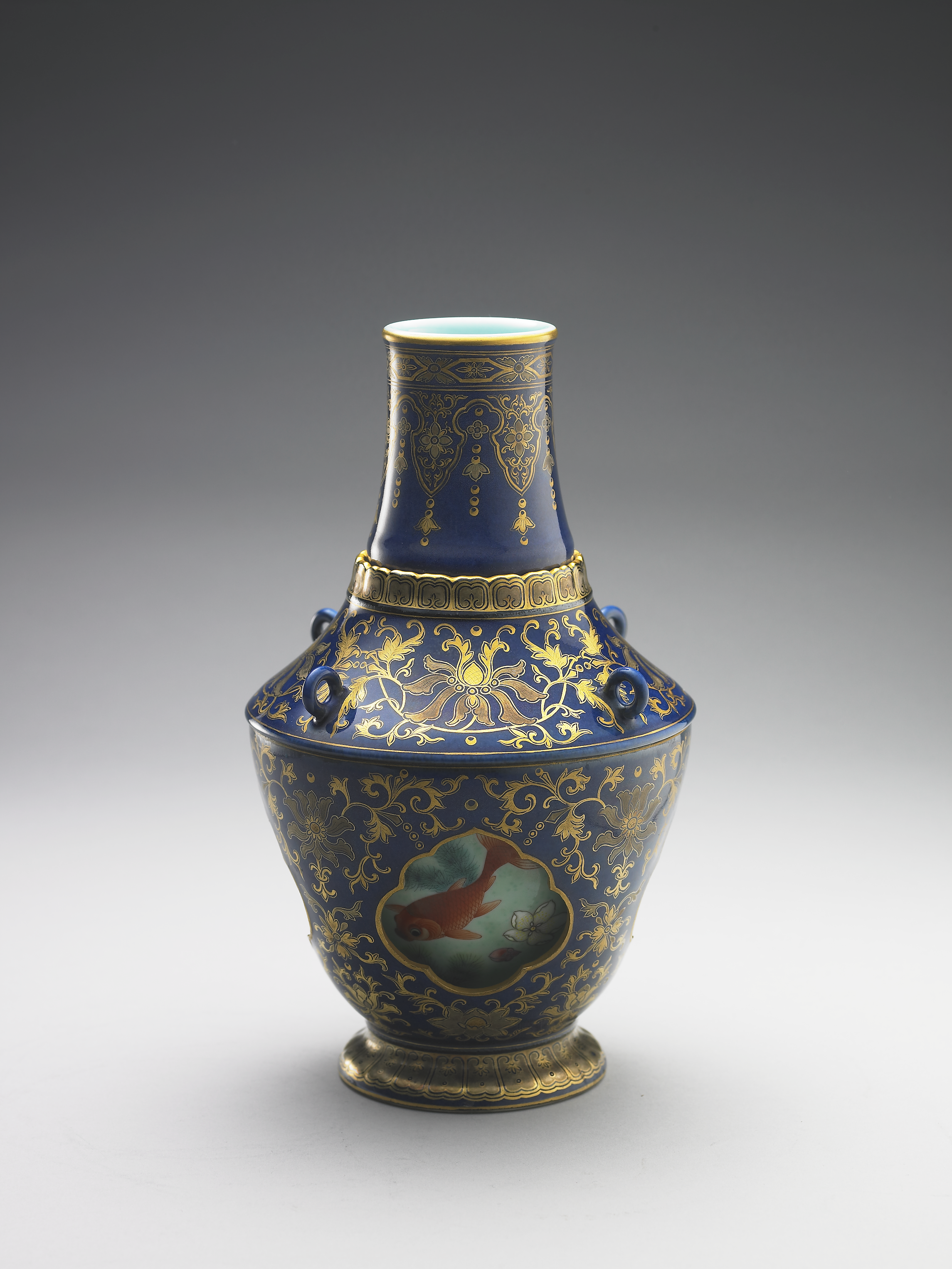
A type of vase with one vase inside another that was introduced by Tang Ying

While he was working at the Imperial Household Department, Tang Ying produced designs for decorating porcelain pieces. In 1728, during the reign of the Yongzheng Emperor, Tang Ying was sent to Jingdezhen in Jiangxi to supervise the production of Imperial porcelain. Tang was initially assistant to Nian Xiyao, working as the resident Manager at Jingdezhen. Tang was said to have learnt making pottery by living closely with the workmen at Jingdezhen for three years. In 1735, during the reign of the Qianlong Emperor, he replaced Nian who was accused of corruption. Although in control of Jingdezhen as Superintendent of the Imperial porcelain works, he was stationed most of the time at Huai'an or Jiujiang Custom Offices since he was also responsible for collecting custom duties.

Tang was the only superintendent who had a close understanding of the potting process, and played a significant role in the development of ceramics production in Jingdezhen. Under Tang's supervision, the quality of the Jingdezhen improved and some of the finest porcelain produced during the Qing dynasty were made during his tenure. He was able to communicate effectively what the Emperor wanted to the workmen to produce the ware required, and his writings on porcelain provided invaluable information on the production of Jingdezhen porcelain in this period. He also personally made porcelain pieces signed with his various names.

Tang Ying introduced a number of innovations during his tenure at Jingdezhen, such as new colours (for example different shades of purple and blue) and glazes, and introduced new designs and techniques (e.g. silvering and painting in ink black). He managed to reproduce textures and effects of wares of other material such as silver, wood, jade or bronze, copied porcelain from other countries, and he was also known for revival of old forms and faithful imitation of antique wares such as those of the Song era.

Porcelain pieces produced for two Qing emperors under Tang Ying's supervision are highly regarded, and their quality is considered unmatched before or during his time. A vase believed to have been presented by Tang Ying to Qianlong Emperor fetched a record price of US$69.5 million at auction in 2010, although it was later sold for US$35 million after the original buyer disputed the auctioneer's fees. Another was sold for US$19 million in 2018, while a smaller piece from 1742 sold for US$9 million in 2020. These yangcai vases have a reticulated form with double walls, an innovation introduced by Tang Ying in the early 1740s. These vases were technically difficult and expensive to produce and Tang Ying presented nine such single vases to Qianlong.

Tang also served for a short period (1750–51) in Canton in the Maritime Customs Service. He returned to Jingdezhen, but retired in 1756 and died shortly afterwards on the 27th day of the 7th month the same year. Although his successor was able to maintain some standard at Jingdezhen, the quality of porcelain produced declined, and after the reign Qianlong, the quality of porcelain produced in Jingdezhen deteriorated.

== Theatre ==
Tang Ying became interested in the local popular theatre. He was unusual in seeking inspiration from local theatre for his plays, and more than half of the plays he wrote feature content derived from popular local theatre. The plays he wrote are eclectic, where Kunqu opera melodies are mixed with local ones. He wrote 17 operas, among the best-known are Crossroad at the Slope (Chinese: 十字坡; pinyin: Shízì Pō) and Laughter in a Flour Barrel (Chinese: 麵缸笑; pinyin: Miàngāng Xiào). Crossroad at the Slope is a single-act play derived from the local bangzi opera (折子戲), and features a story from the Water Margin. Laughter in a Flour Barrel tells the story of a quick-witted courtesan who survived abuse. Other plays include Predestined Debt (Chinese: 天緣債; pinyin: Tiānyuán Zhài), a twenty-scene play from 1754.

== Other works ==
Tang Ying wrote or supervised the writing of a number of books on porcelain which are important documents on porcelain making during the Qing dynasty, such as The Order of Porcelain-making (Twenty Illustrations of the Manufacture of Pottery) (陶冶圖編次), a book written at Qianlong's command. Other books on pottery include Record of Pottery Production (陶成紀事), A Summary of the Pottery Business (陶務敘略), and Draughts of Instructions on the Manufacture of Porcelain (瓷務事宜諭稿).

Tang also wrote poetry and excelled at calligraphy and paintings. His poetry is collected in Collections of Songs during the Reign of Kangxi and in Potters Thoughts (陶人心语). His calligraphy and paintings are kept among the Palace Museum collection.

== Gallery ==
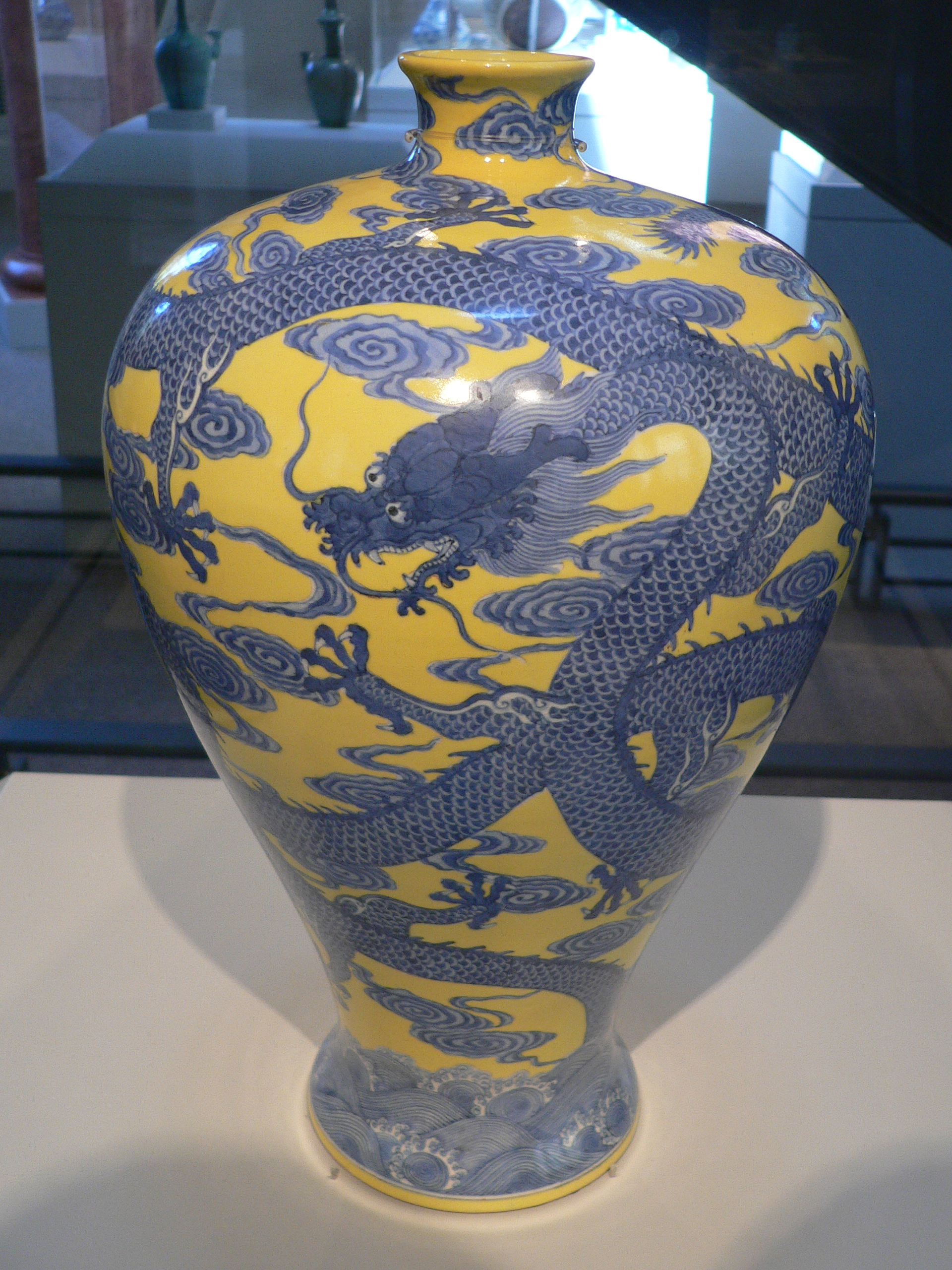
Vase attributed to Tang Ying

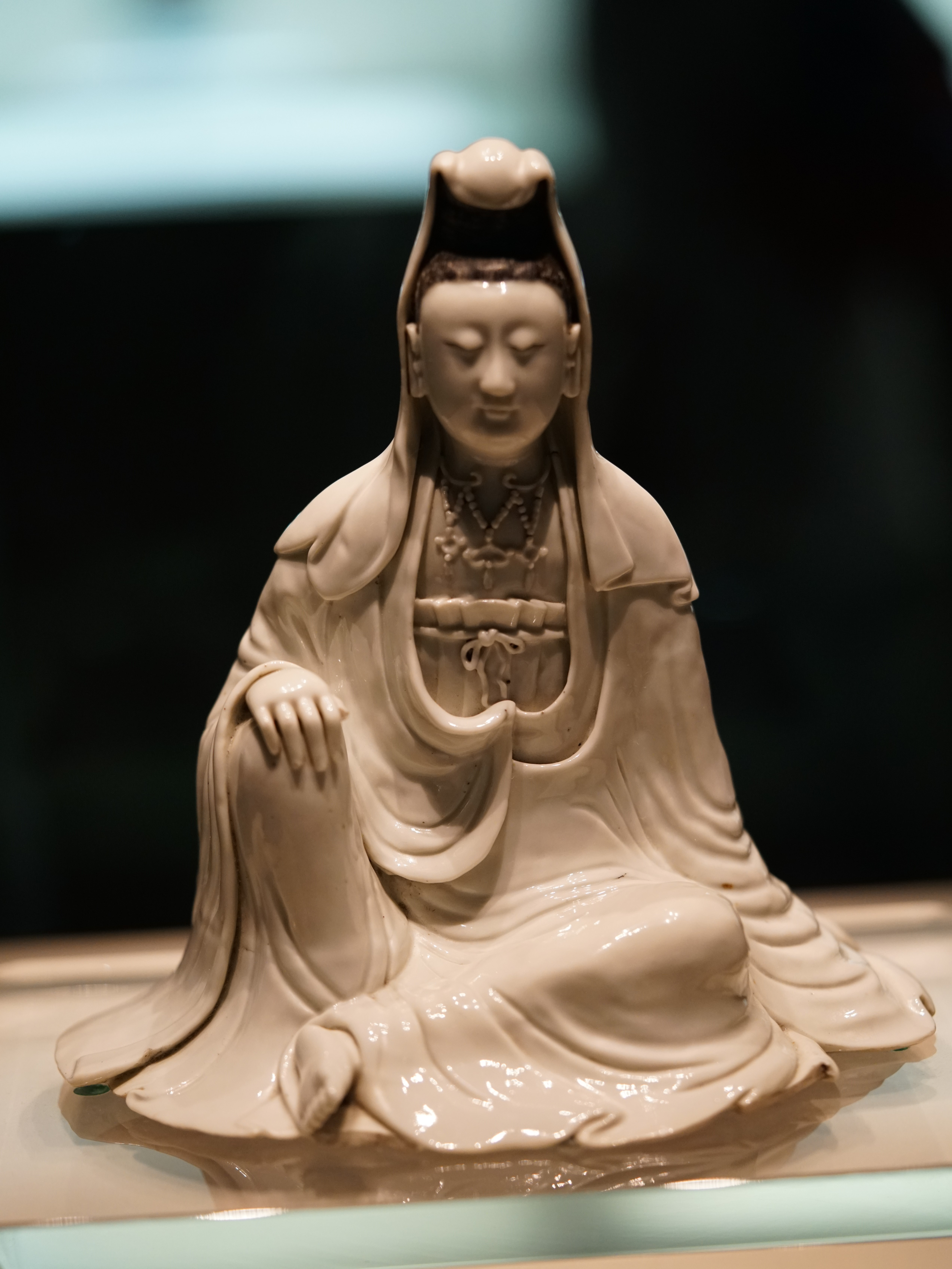
A Guanyin figure

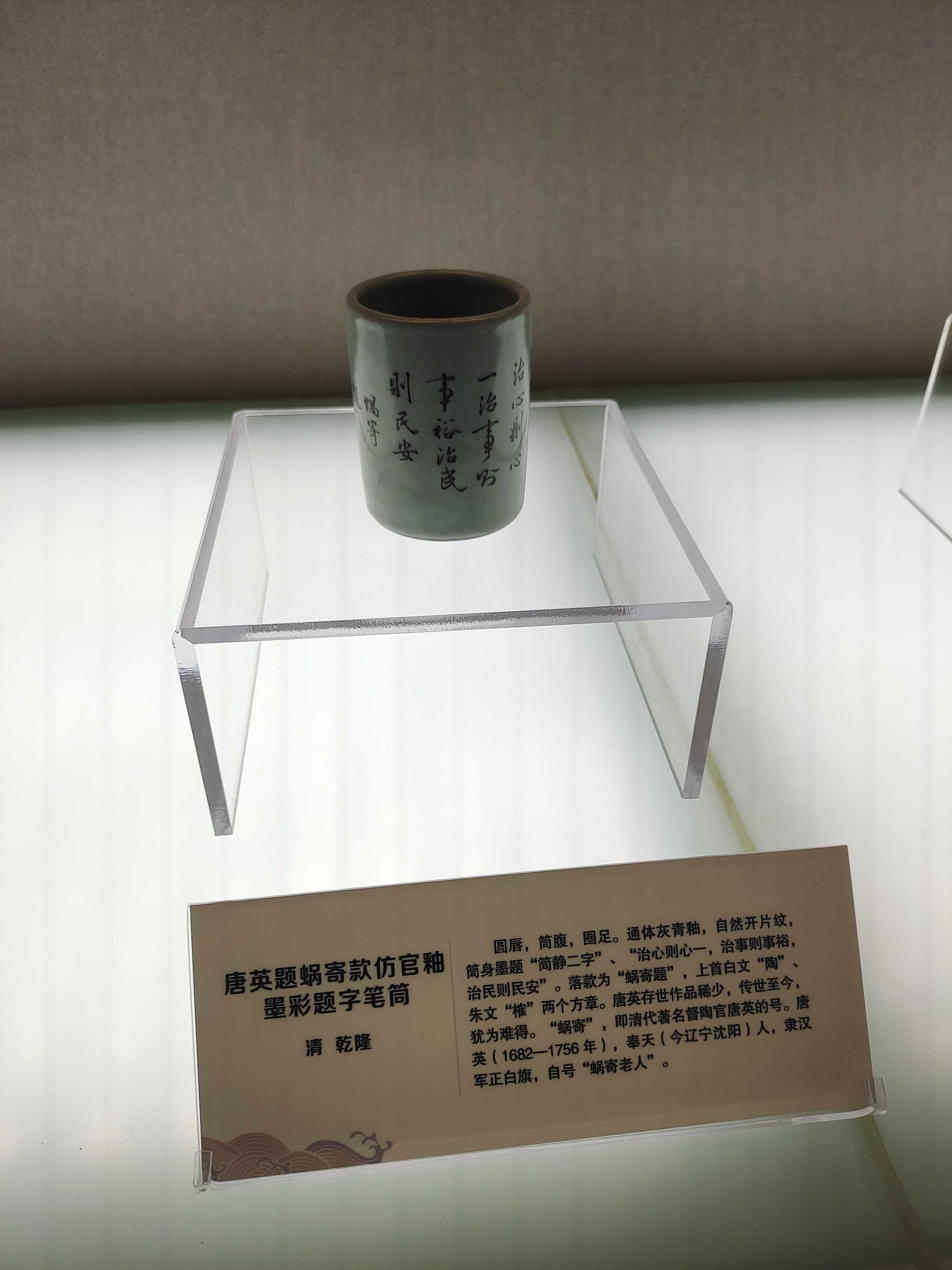
A brush holder with inscription by Tang Ying
