= Canton Township =

Canton Township may refer to:

- Canton Township, Fulton County, Illinois
- Canton Township, McPherson County, Kansas
- Canton Township, Michigan
- Canton Township, Fillmore County, Minnesota
- Canton Township, Ohio
- Canton Township, Bradford County, Pennsylvania
- Canton Township, Washington County, Pennsylvania

== See also ==
- Canton (disambiguation)
