= Canton (band) =

Italian disco band, formed 1983

Canton is an Italian Italo disco musical group formed in 1983. They entered the 1984 Sanremo Music Festival with the song "Sonnambulismo" (that they later remade in English as "Sleepwalking"), ranking fourth in the 'Nuove proposte' section. The song was a moderate commercial success. In 1985, the songs "Please Don't Stay" and "Stay With Me" (produced by Stock Aitken Waterman) became hits through European charts.

== Personnel ==
- Marcello "Marci" Semeraro - vocals (1983-1986, 2007–present)
- Francesco Marchetti - guitar (1983-1986, 2007–present)
- Stefano Valdo - bass (1983-1986)

== Discography ==
List of singles as lead artist, with selected chart positions
Title	Year	Peak
Title	Year	IT
"Please Don't Stay"	1984	31
"Sleepwalking"	1984	–
"Sonnambulismo"	1984	36
"Stay with Me"	1985	44
