= Canton Electronics =

German loudspeaker manufacturer

- Industry: Audio
- Founded: 1972
- Headquarters: Weilrod, Germany
- Products: Loudspeakers
- Website: canton.de/en

Canton Electronics is a German loudspeaker manufacturer, known for producing loudspeakers.

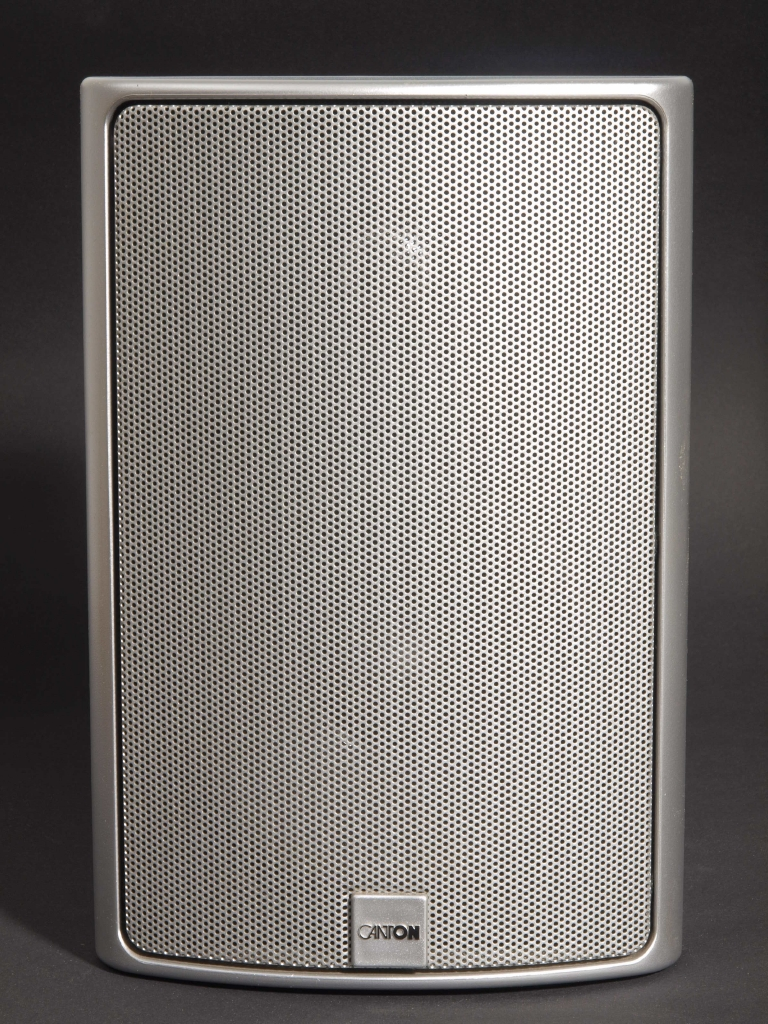
Canton Plus XL loudspeaker

== History ==
Canton was founded in October 1972 by Hubert Milbers (Management), Otfried Sandig (Marketing, Sales), Wolfgang Seikritt (Development) and Günther Seitz (Technology). The company released their first bookshelf speakers that year. The company headquarters are located in Weilrod, Germany.
