= Canton porcelain =

Chinese style of ceramics

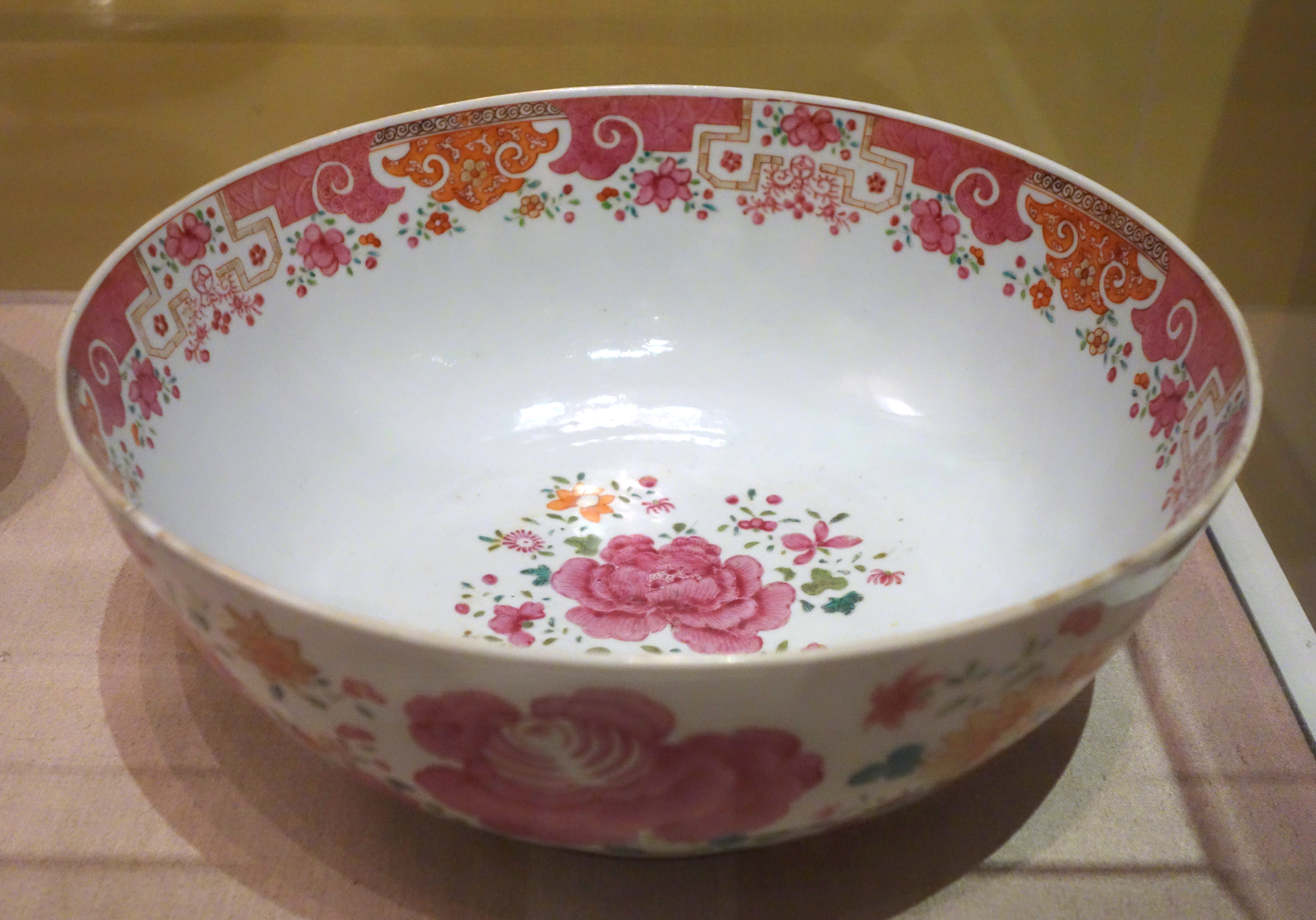
- A Canton Famille rose porcelain punch bowl (c. 1765)
- Traditional Chinese: 廣州彩瓷
- Simplified Chinese: 广州彩瓷
- Literal meaning: Canton coloured porcelain
Transcriptions
Standard Mandarin
- Hanyu Pinyin: Guǎngzhōu cǎi cí
Yue: Cantonese
- Jyutping: gwong2 zau1 coi2 ci4

Guangcai
- Traditional Chinese: 廣彩
- Simplified Chinese: 广彩
- Literal meaning: Canton colour
Transcriptions
Standard Mandarin
- Hanyu Pinyin: Guǎngcǎi
Yue: Cantonese
- Jyutping: gwong2 coi2

Canton or Cantonese porcelain is the characteristic style of ceramic ware decorated in Guangzhou, the capital of Guangdong and (prior to 1842) the sole legal port for export of Chinese goods to Europe. As such, it was one of the major forms of exportware produced in China in the 18th and 20th centuries.

== History ==
Typically, the exportware was made, glazed, and fired at Jingdezhen but decorated with enamels in Guangzhou (then usually romanized as Canton) for export to the west via the Thirteen Factories of the Canton System. Canton famille rose in the 19th century was typically decorated with figures and birds, flowers and insects, predominantly in pink and green.

The decorative famille rose patterns used in export wares may be differentiated by the following terms: Rose Canton which is decorated with flowers, birds and insects but with no human figures; Rose Mandarin with human figures as the main subject and introduced in the late 18th century; and Rose Medallion which has different panels that may be of different subjects and introduced in the 19th century.

== See also ==
- Cantonese culture
