= Canton (song) =

1983 single by Japan

Song by Japan

from the album Tin Drum
- Released: 13 November 1981
- Recorded: 24–28 June 1981
- Genre: New wave
- Length: 5:30
- Label: Virgin
- Songwriters: David Sylvian; Steve Jansen
- Producers: Steve Nye; Japan

"Canton"

Single by Japan

from the album Oil on Canvas
- B-side: "Visions of China"
- Released: 13 May 1983
- Recorded: November 1982
- Venue: Hammersmith Odeon, London
- Genre: New wave
- Length: 4:05 (7" version); 5:36 (12" and album version)
- Label: Virgin
- Songwriters: David Sylvian; Steve Jansen
- Producers: John Punter; Japan

Japan singles chronology
"All Tomorrow's Parties" (1982)	"Canton" (1983)	"Blackwater" (1991)

"Canton" is an instrumental song by English new wave band Japan. It was originally released on the album Tin Drum in 1981, and was then released as the only single from the live album Oil on Canvas in May 1983. It peaked at number 42 on the UK Singles Chart.

== Original recording ==
"Canton" was the first song recorded for Japan's album Tin Drum, along with "Talking Drum" and David Sylvian said the two songs "worked so well we’d arrange the rest of the album around the same ideas. Difficulty with recording arose when Mick Karn had to rub the aluminium neck of his Travis Bean bass guitar quite frantically and the heat generated "was enough to bend the metal out of pitch". Because of this, the guitar had to be cooled down mid-recording and to get around this problem, Karn switched to a local bass manufacture Wal, "which worked perfectly on the first take". The band also found under some tarpaulin an instrument made of bamboo that was several feet in height and width and sound was "produced by rattling peas within the bamboo" and these "duplicate the piece’s main melody".

Steve Jansen recalled that "‘With songs such as ‘Canton’ and ‘Visions of China’ the drums were driving the structuring of the tracks".

== Themes ==
The title refers to Guangzhou and is one of the numerous tracks thematically related to China, and Asia in general, in the band's discography.

== Reception ==
Reviewing the single for Record Mirror, Simon Hills wrote "Sounds like the theme music to The Secret Lovers of Chairman Mao", with "more oriental, and totally glib, 'art' on the flip side with 'Visions Of China' in which the group imagine all the royalties they could get by selling a record to the country with the biggest population".

== Track listings ==
7"

1. "Canton" – 4:05
2. "Visions of China" – 3:45

12"

1. "Canton" – 5:36
2. "Visions of China" – 3:45

== Personnel ==
- David Sylvian – keyboards, cover design
- Mick Karn – fretless bass, dida
- Richard Barbieri – keyboards
- Steve Jansen – drums, percussion, angklung
- Masami Tsuchiya – keyboards
- Yuka Fujii – photography
- John Punter – engineer, producer
- Nigel Walker – engineer

== Charts ==
Chart (1983)	Peak position
UK Singles (Official Charts)	42
