= Oberto Cantone =

Italian mathematician

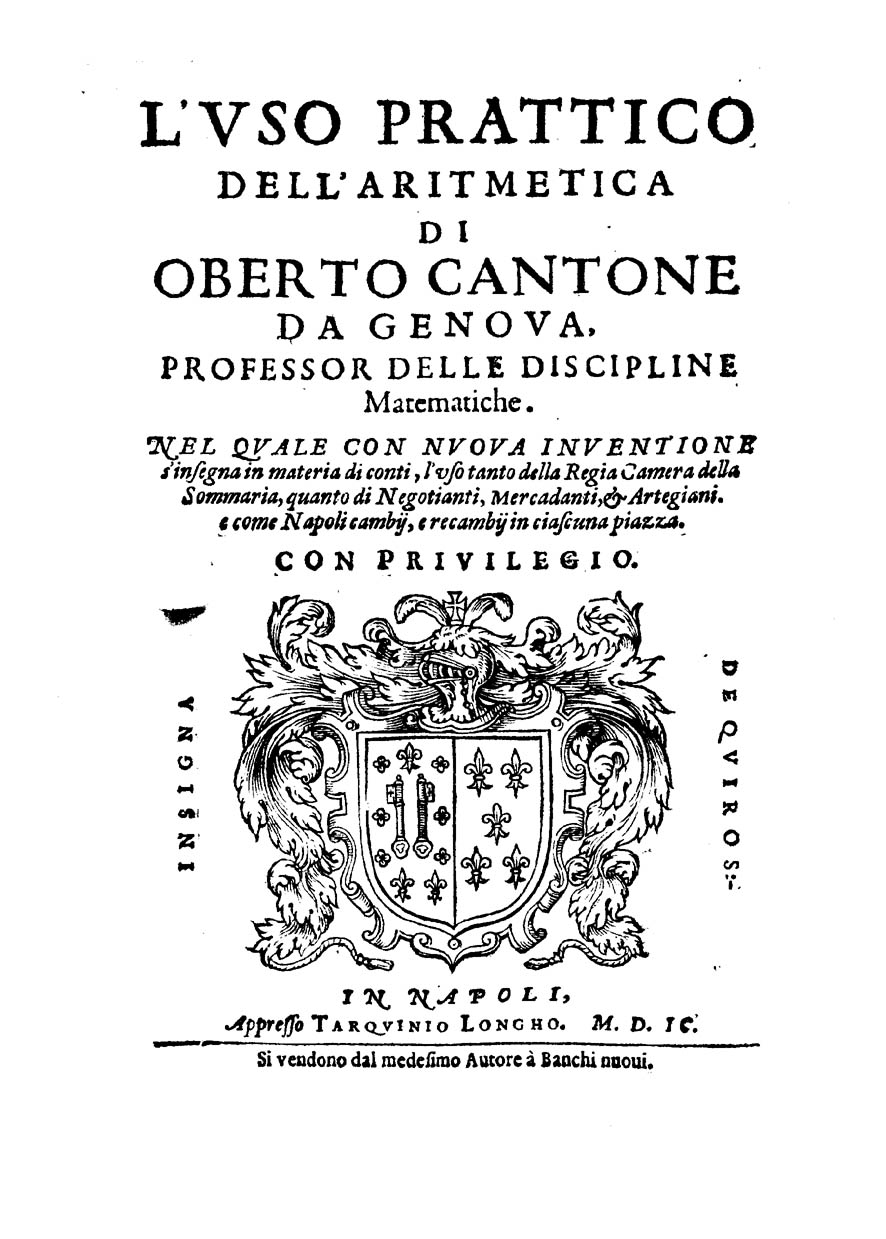
L'vso prattico dell'aritmetica, 1599

Oberto Cantone (Genoa, 16th–17th century) was an Italian mathematician.

== Life ==
He was a professor in Naples. He is well-known for his works about the use of maths in the business field, in particular L'uso pratico dell'artimetica, printed in Naples in 1599, which is inspired by the work of Pietro Borghi.

== Works ==
- L'vso prattico dell'aritmetica (in Italian). Naples: Tarquinio Longo. 1599.
- L'vso prattico dell'aritmetica e geometria (in Italian). Naples: Tarquinio Longo. 1606.
