= Isaac Berechiah Canton =

Italian Talmudist

Isaac Berechiah Canton (fl. mid–18th century) was an Italian Talmudist. He established a yeshiva in Turin. He is the author of a responsum in Samson Morpurgo's Shemesh Ẓedaḳah. Ghirondi possessed in manuscript some other halakhic decisions by Canton, and saw also a manuscript work of his entitled Yetad ha-Ohel ('The Pin of the Tent'), an index to Solomon Urbino's dictionary of Hebrew synonyms entitled Ohel Mo'ed.
