= Canton system (Prussia) =

1733–1813 military recruitment system in Prussia

The Canton System (German: Kantonsystem or Kantonssystem) or Canton Regulation (Kantonreglement) was a system of recruitment used by the Prussian army between 1733 and 1813. The country was divided into recruiting districts called cantons (Kantone), and each canton was the responsibility of a regiment. (Note: Prussia was a composite state prior to 1806. The Prussian king held several fiefs of the Holy Roman Empire in addition to the Kingdom of Prussia proper, which lay outside the Empire. In the 18th century, all the lands of the Prussian king were gradually administratively unified and the Canton System embraced almost all of them.) The system was distinctly Prussian. Every male was from the youngest possible age enrolled in the army, and by 1740 the Prussian army, with a strength of 3.6% of the total population, was proportionately the largest in Europe. The new system replaced coercive recruiting, which in turn replaced the hiring of undependable and expensive mercenary forces. It allowed the army to double from 38,000 to 76,000, making it the fourth largest in Europe, and it linked the local population more closely to the royal government.

== Historical context ==
Upon his accession in 1713, King Frederick William I abolished the provincial militias, obligated his soldiers to lifelong service and transferred all responsibility for recruitment from civilian authorities to regimental officers. This system, which remained in place until the introduction of the cantons, occasioned much abuse and even bloodshed.

In February and March 1721 the king prohibited coercive recruiting, which only increased the competition between recruiters. On 14 September 1722 he published a "Sharpened Edict against the Flight of Subjects and their Children in Western and Eastern Pomerania" and on 11 November a "Patent, that the Property of those Subjects and Native Children who flee from Fear of Recruitment shall be Confiscated", but the solution to the conflict between the army—which required peasant recruits—and the royal finances—which required the peasants' agrarian labour—was only solved by the self-interest of the regimental commanders. In order to meet their recruitment obligations while following the king's strictures on domestic recruiting, they were forced to seek more recruits abroad. To cover the higher expenses of foreign recruitment, they gradually extended the furloughs of those recruits taken from their own estates (commanders were invariably either estate owners—Junkers—or close relatives of owners) so that the latter were only obligated to undertake basic training in peacetime. The practice of regular furloughs was gradually extended to all recruits. The commanders also introduced enrollment (Enrollierung): male children too young to serve were added to the enlistment rolls and given furlough passes to prevent them from being recruited by other regiments when they were old enough.

== Establishment of the system ==
In 1733, Frederick William converted these widespread practices into a universal system. By a series of three Cabinet Orders (Allerhöchste Kabinetts-Ordre, AKOs) of 1 and 8 May and 15 September, the country was divided into cantons and the "enrollment of [all] male youth" mandated within the cantons. As a result, recruitment was technically replaced by enrollment and underage male peasants converted into cantonists (Kantonisten). The term "recruitment" thereafter applied to the hiring of foreign mercenaries only; cantonists were said to be inducted into service when they came of age, but the practice of forcibly and illegally impressing peasants into service continued on a small scale throughout the 18th century, and was the source of numerous complaints. Soldiers were also sometimes sold by one regimental commander to another, but this practice was outlawed by Frederick I and by Frederick II in edicts of 1743 and 1748, although it was already in decline by 1740.

== Number of soldiers ==
The average canton comprised about 5000 hearths, but the number of soldiers varied considerably. In the Margraviate of Brandenburg a regiment typically consisted of 5000 soldiers, while in the Duchy of Further Pomerania it consisted of about 5900. The canton system did not cover all of Prussia. Certain regions inherited exemptions from before 1733, but by 1808 only the cities of Berlin, Brandenburg, Breslau and Potsdam were exempted.

== 1792 reform ==
On 12 February 1792, on the eve of the French Revolutionary Wars, King Frederick William II issued a revised regulation for the canton system. It laid out the classes that were unconditionally exempt from service: (i) the nobility, (ii) commoners who owned estates valued at over 12,000 Reichstaler, (iii) those with personal wealth in excess of 10,000 Reichstaler and their sons provided that none were craftsmen or peasants, (iv) civil servants, (v) the sons of university professors, (vi) foreigners (Ausländer) resident in Prussia and any sons or servants they brought with them and (vii) the Prussian-born sons of foreigners provided their fathers had either built a house or cultivated a wasteland. One could also be exempted if he was studying at a school or if active on his own in commerce or agriculture, but this exemption ended the moment one left his occupation or was found to be leading an "unstable lifestyle". The student exemption was especially widely abused and after 24 May 1793, one claiming it had to provide proof of studies.

== Obsolescence ==
A series of reforms, such as the introduction of a progressive legal code, the Allgemeines Landrecht für die Preußischen Staaten, in 1794 and the abolition of serfdom in 1807, as well as the Treaty of Tilsit with France made the canton system increasingly obsolete. A Cabinet Order of 21 November 1808 reassigned the regiments of the new Prussian army—limited to 42,000 men by Tilsit—to their cantons. On 6 June 1809, the sons of foreigners lost their exemption and on 8 September the sons of soldiers born in the exempted cities.

On 9 February 1813, following Prussia's participation in the disastrous French invasion of Russia and in preparation for her declaration of war against France, the canton system was suspended "for the duration of the war" and universal conscription introduced through a Cabinet Order. Men between the ages of 17 and 24 could enter the army voluntarily and choose their regiment; all who did not remained eligible to be drafted. Those between 25 and 40 could be drafted into the newly formed Landwehr. On 27 May 1814 the Cabinet Order of 9 February 1813 was rescinded, but the old regiment-based system of enrollment and exemptions was not reintroduced. Instead, on 3 September 1814 the Gesetz über die Verpflichtung zum Kriegsdienst (law on the obligation of military service) was introduced, and all men over 20 years of age were compelled to serve three years in the army and a further two in reserve.

== Sources ==
- Büsch, Otto (1997). Military System and Social Life in Old Regime Prussia, 1713–1807: The Beginnings of the Social Militarization of Prusso-German Society. Studies in Central European Histories. Translated by Gagliardo, John G. Boston: Humanities Press International. Originally published as Militärsystem und Sozialleben im alten Preußen 1713–1807: Die Anfänge der sozialen Militarisierung der preußisch-deutschen Gesellschaft (Berlin: Walter de Gruyter, 1962).
- Dwyer, Philip G. (2013) [2000]. The Rise of Prussia, 1700–1830. Routledge.
- Hofschröer, Peter (1984). Prussian Line Infantry, 1792–1815. Men-at-Arms. Oxford: Osprey.
- Schmidt, Oliver H. (2003). Prussian Regular Infantryman, 1808–15. Oxford: Osprey.
