= Adolescent Sex (song) =

1978 single by Japan

- Cover of the single released in the Netherlands

Single by Japan

from the album Adolescent Sex
- B-side: "Sometimes I Feel So Low"
- Released: April 1978; 18 October 1978 (re-recorded version)
- Genre: New wave; glam rock; funk rock
- Length: 3:43 (original 7" and album version); 4:11 (re-recorded version)
- Label: Hansa
- Songwriter: David Sylvian
- Producer: Ray Singer

Japan singles chronology
"Don't Rain on My Parade" (1978)	"Adolescent Sex" (1978)	"The Unconventional" (1978)

"Adolescent Sex" is a song by English new wave band Japan, released as a single from their debut album of the same name in 1978. It was the band's only single to chart in Europe outside of the UK and Ireland, as it was a top-40 hit in the Netherlands and Belgium.

== Release ==
The song was first released in Spain in April 1978, with the B-side being the band's previous single "Don't Rain on My Parade". This version of "Adolescent Sex" was the same as found on the Adolescent Sex album, which was also released in April. In Spring 1978, Japan re-recorded the song, making it sound punchier. This version was then first released in August as the other side of a double A-side single with "The Unconventional" in the UK. It was then released with the B-side "Sometimes I Feel So Low" in Germany in October. This single was then released in the Netherlands, Australia and France in 1979. The re-recorded version was also released in Italy in April 1979 with the B-side "Transmission".

In Japan, a limited edition flexi-disc single was released in October 1978 with the band's second album Obscure Alternatives. A Japanese fan club competition got entrants to write lyrics in Japanese, inspired by songs from Adolescent Sex. The winners' lyrics were read by David Sylvian and the single is purely spoken word, with no musical content.

== Reception ==
Reviewing the song retrospectively for AllMusic, Amy Hanson wrote ""Adolescent Sex" flays wide into classic funk bass-beating thumps, glammed out guitar, snotty punk vocals and proto disco cum wave synths. Put back together, though, and fed through Japan frontman David Sylvian's pockmarked brain, the song is an onslaught of a bewildering battery of stylistic nervous breakdowns, all so gorgeously twined that the resulting brew is simply stunning". In reviewing the Adolescent Sex album for Perfect Sound Forever, James Paton described the song as "seeing Sylvian regurgitate his mainstay lyrics of love and dancing, twisting them into some punky song about prostitution that marks the return of the siren synth, with Barbieri lending the composition a certain creepiness with his keys that prevents it from falling flat on its face".

== Track listings ==
7" (Spain)

1. "Adolescent Sex" – 3:43
2. "Don't Rain on My Parade" – 2:54

7" (Germany, Netherlands, Australia, France)

1. "Adolescent Sex" (re-recorded version) – 4:11
2. "Sometimes I Feel So Low" – 3:44

7" (Italy)

1. "Adolescent Sex" (re-recorded version) – 4:11
2. "Transmission" – 4:45

7" (Japan)

1. "Adolescent Sex" – 2:03
2. "Adolescent Sex" – 2:25
3. "Lovers on Main Street" – 2:36
4. "Suburban Love" – 2:33

== Charts ==
Chart (1979)	Peak position
Belgium (Ultratop 50 Flanders)	28
Netherlands (Dutch Top 40)	27
Netherlands (Single Top 100)	21
