= Ray Singer (music producer) =

British record producer (born 1946)

- Born: 4 July 1946 (age 79); Tonbridge, Kent, England
- Occupations: Record producer, singer, songwriter

Ray Singer (born 4 July 1946) is a British record producer, singer, songwriter and founder and owner of Singer Records. Singer was instrumental in launching the careers of Peter Sarstedt, David Sylvian, Japan, and Ana Silvera.

Singer was born in Tonbridge, Kent and raised in Brighton. His secondary education was at Carmel College, Oxfordshire.

== Early career: 1960s-1970s ==
He first became involved in music by forming a skiffle group as a student in Brighton, and in 1964 made his first records as a singer under the wing of Jeffrey Kruger, who signed him to his independent record label, Ember Records, after seeing him sing in a charity show. Ember Records released Singer's "Tell Me Now" in 1964.

Singer appeared on television programmes with The Who, the Small Faces, and The Kinks and was a featured artist on Gadzooks!, a weekly BBC2 TV show with Marianne Faithfull and Lulu. Always more interested in production/arrangement, he had the opportunity to work with record producers such as Shel Talmy (The Kinks, The Who) and Jimmy Miller (Traffic, The Rolling Stones), an experience that led him to eventually produce for Chris Blackwell's Island Records. He also attended the London School of Film Technique and joined Nirvana, with fellow film student, Alex Spiropolous. They were signed to Island Records and recorded "Tiny Goddess".

In 1978 he produced the first 2 albums of Japan - Adolescent Sex and Obscure Alternatives.

As a songwriter he had success with Françoise Hardy, whose version of "Tiny Goddess" ("Je Ne Sais Pas Ce Que Veux") went to number one in the French charts. Singer also went on to write and produce for the French singer Michel Polnareff.

== Singer/Sarstedt collaboration ==
Whilst working in Paris he discovered a busker from London, singer-songwriter Peter Sarstedt. Singer took him into the studios for Island and recorded Peter Sarstedt, an album of his compositions. From these sessions came the million selling "Where Do You Go To (My Lovely)?" Sarstedt hits that followed included "Frozen Orange Juice" and "I'm A Cathedral".

== 1980s–1990s ==
Singer was eventually to settle in London, becoming best known for his work with British singer-songwriters, including Peter Sarstedt, Joan Armatrading and Ana Silvera. Some of this work was produced by his own production company, "Rocking Horse Productions", which he co-founded with Simon Napier-Bell.

He then went to New York where he was signed to make albums for RCA, ABC and UNI Records. He came back to London and worked mostly at Olympic Studios in Barnes with top musicians including The Average White Band's bass player Alan Gorrie and guitarist Onnie McIntyre, guitarist Chris Spedding, drummer Jim Gordon and bass player Herbie Flowers.

Singer also started producing for the German record label, Ariola Records, and had hits with "When You Walk in the Room" and "It's Only Make Believe", by the boy band Child, and subsequently had success with Joan Armatrading's "Rosie" and Robin Sarstedt's "My Resistance Is Low". He produced the first two albums for pop/rock group Japan, Adolescent Sex (1978) and Obscure Alternatives (also 1978).

== Film and television music ==
He started to work with the film composer, Michael Storey, and went on to produce over one hundred television commercials, including the Levi's and Guinness commercials featuring actor Rutger Hauer. Singer's graduation from the London Film School, and his interest in movies, led him onto producing the soundtracks for the British film, Another Country, starring Rupert Everett and Colin Firth and, in Hollywood, Waiting for the Light, starring Shirley MacLaine and Teri Garr. Television soundtracks followed, including the BBC adaption of John le Carré's A Perfect Spy, Anthony Horowitz's The Gift and South by South-East. The Lynda La Plante series, Civvies, won an Ivor Novello Award for best music.

== 2000-present ==
Singer set up his own recording studio in London and his own label, Singer Records. The success of the Wes Anderson movie, The Darjeeling Limited, with Owen Wilson, Adrien Brody and Anjelica Huston, which featured Peter Sarstedt's "Where Do You Go To, My Lovely", led to Singer Records releasing The Lost Album by Peter Sarstedt, which has become an iTunes best seller.

Other artists featured on Singer Records are Suggs from Madness, Toyah Willcox and Imaani from Incognito.

He worked on singer-songwriter Ana Silvera's album, The Aviary, co-produced alongside Brad Albetta.

== See also ==
- List of people from Tonbridge
