= List of UK singles chart number ones of the 1960s =

The UK singles chart is the official record chart in the United Kingdom. Prior to 1969 there was no official singles chart; however, The Official Charts Company and Guinness' British Hit Singles & Albums regard the canonical sources as New Musical Express (NME) before 10 March 1960 and Record Retailer from then until 15 February 1969 when Retailer and the BBC jointly commissioned the British Market Research Bureau (BMRB) to compile the charts. The choice to use Record Retailer as the canonical source for the 1960s has been contentious because NME (which continued compiling charts beyond March 1960) had the biggest circulation of periodicals in the decade and was more widely followed.

As well as the chart compilers mentioned previously, Melody Maker, Disc and Record Mirror all compiled their own charts during the decade. Due to the lack of any official chart the BBC aggregated results from all these charts to announce its own Pick of the Pops chart. One source explains that the reason for using the Record Retailer chart for the 1960s was that it was "the only chart to have as many as 50 positions for almost the entire decade". The sample size of Record Retailer in the early 1960s was around 30 stores whereas NME and Melody Maker were sampling more than 100 stores. In 1969, the first BMRB chart was compiled using postal returns of sales logs from 250 record shops.

In terms of number-one singles, The Beatles were the most successful group of the decade having seventeen singles reach the top spot. The longest duration of a single at number-one was eight weeks and this was achieved on three occasions: "It's Now or Never" by Elvis Presley in 1960; "Wonderful Land" by The Shadows in 1962 and "Sugar, Sugar" by The Archies in 1969. The Beatles' song "She Loves You" became the best-selling single of all time in 1963, a record it held until 1977 when band member Paul McCartney's new band, Wings, surpassed it with "Mull of Kintyre". "She Loves You" was the best-selling song of the decade and one of fourteen songs believed to have sold more than one million copies in the 1960s.

== Number-one singles ==
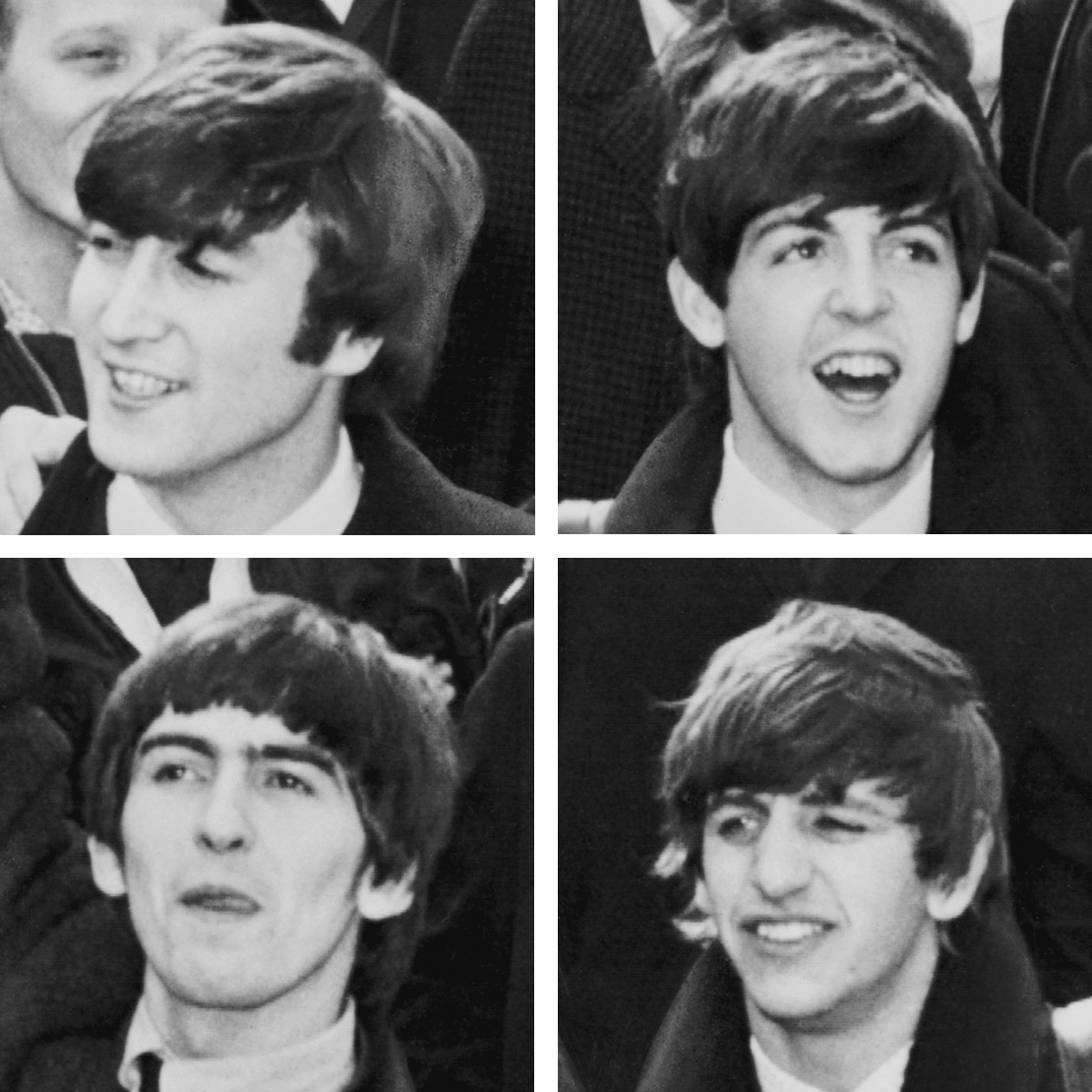
The Beatles had seventeen number-one singles in the 1960s, more than any other artist. Their single "She Loves You" was the best-selling of the decade.

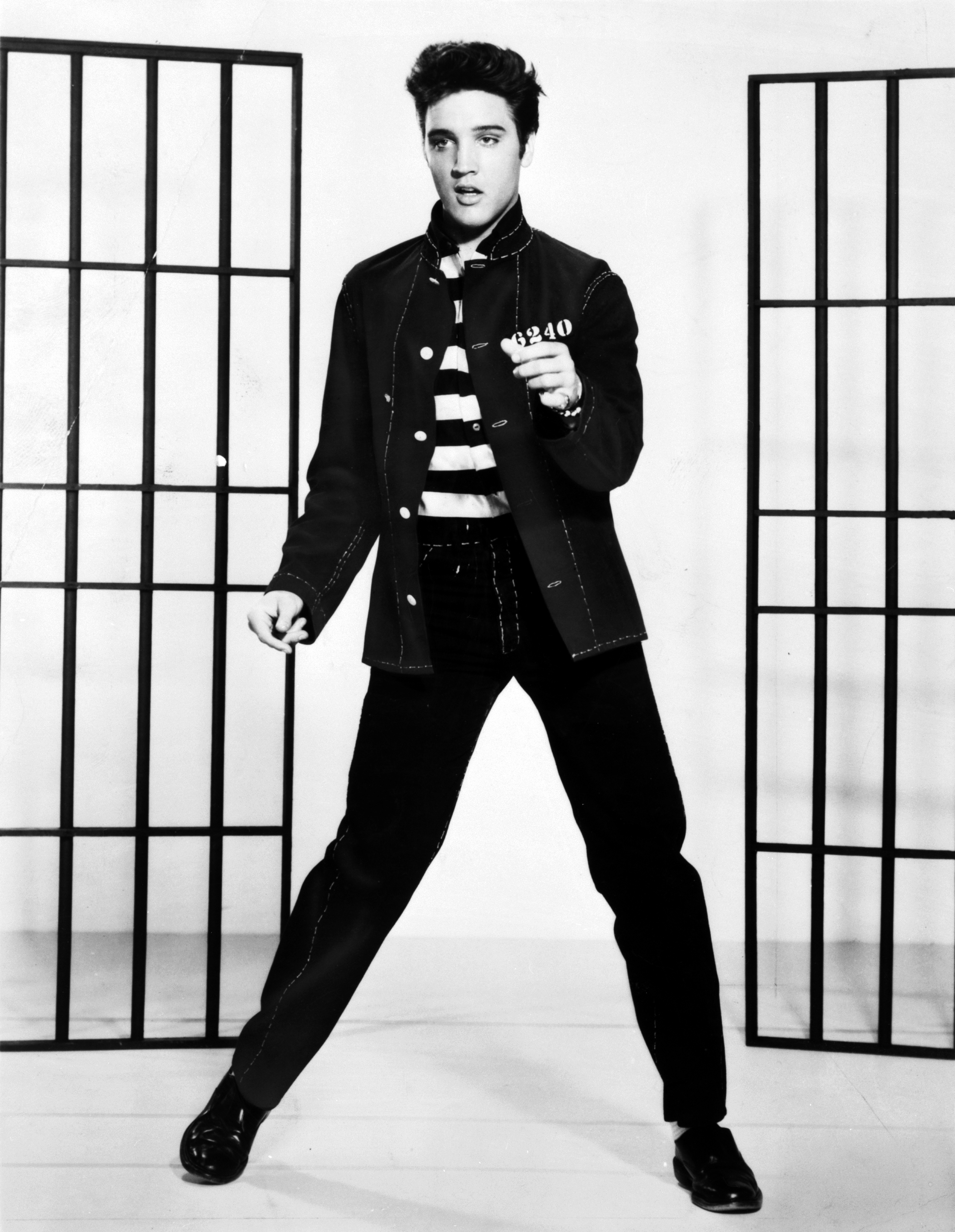
Elvis Presley had eleven number-ones throughout the decade. "It's Now or Never" was the best-selling single of 1960 and spent an unsurpassed (but equalled) eight weeks at number one during the 1960s.

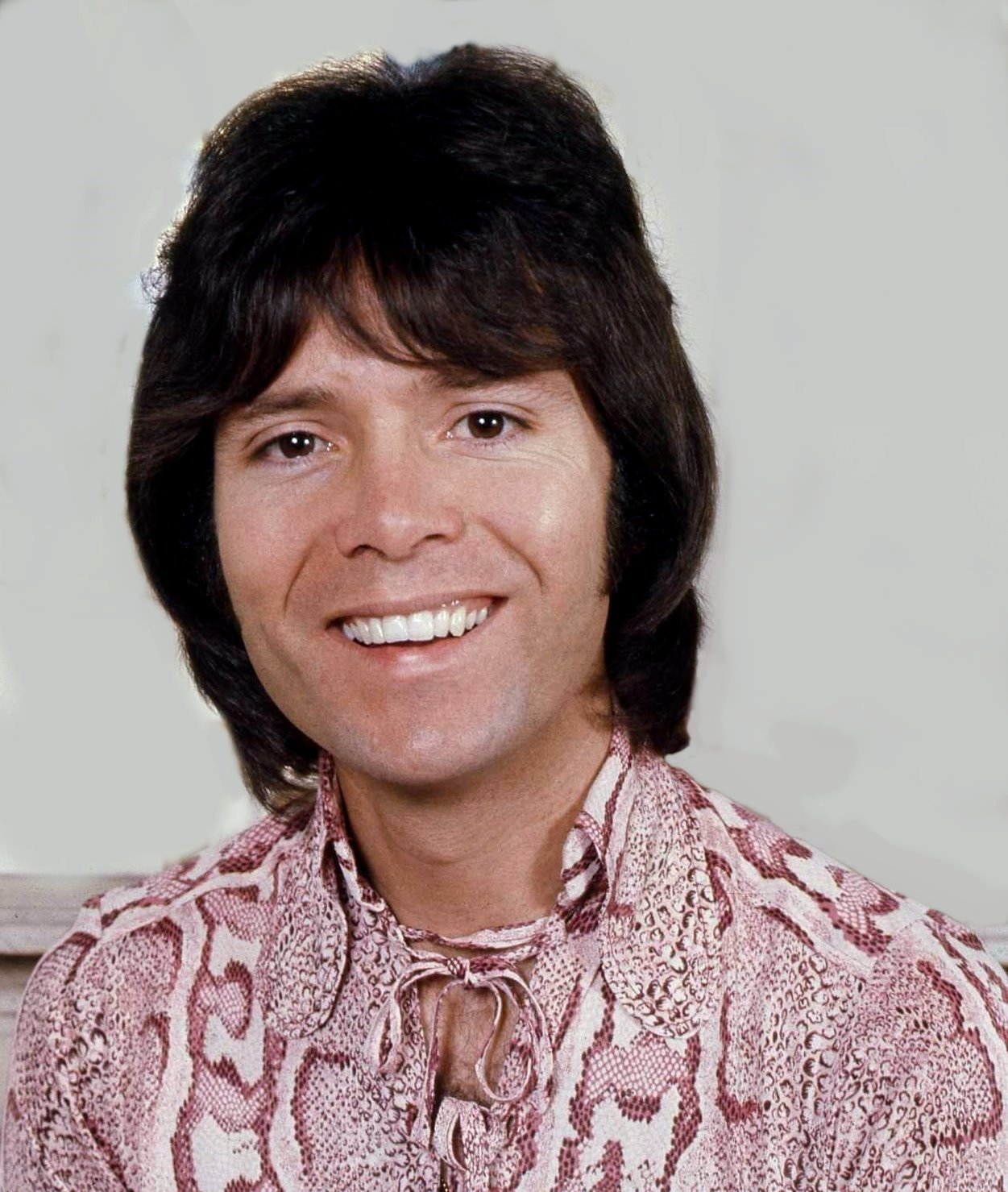
Cliff Richard achieved seven of his number-one singles during the 1960s.

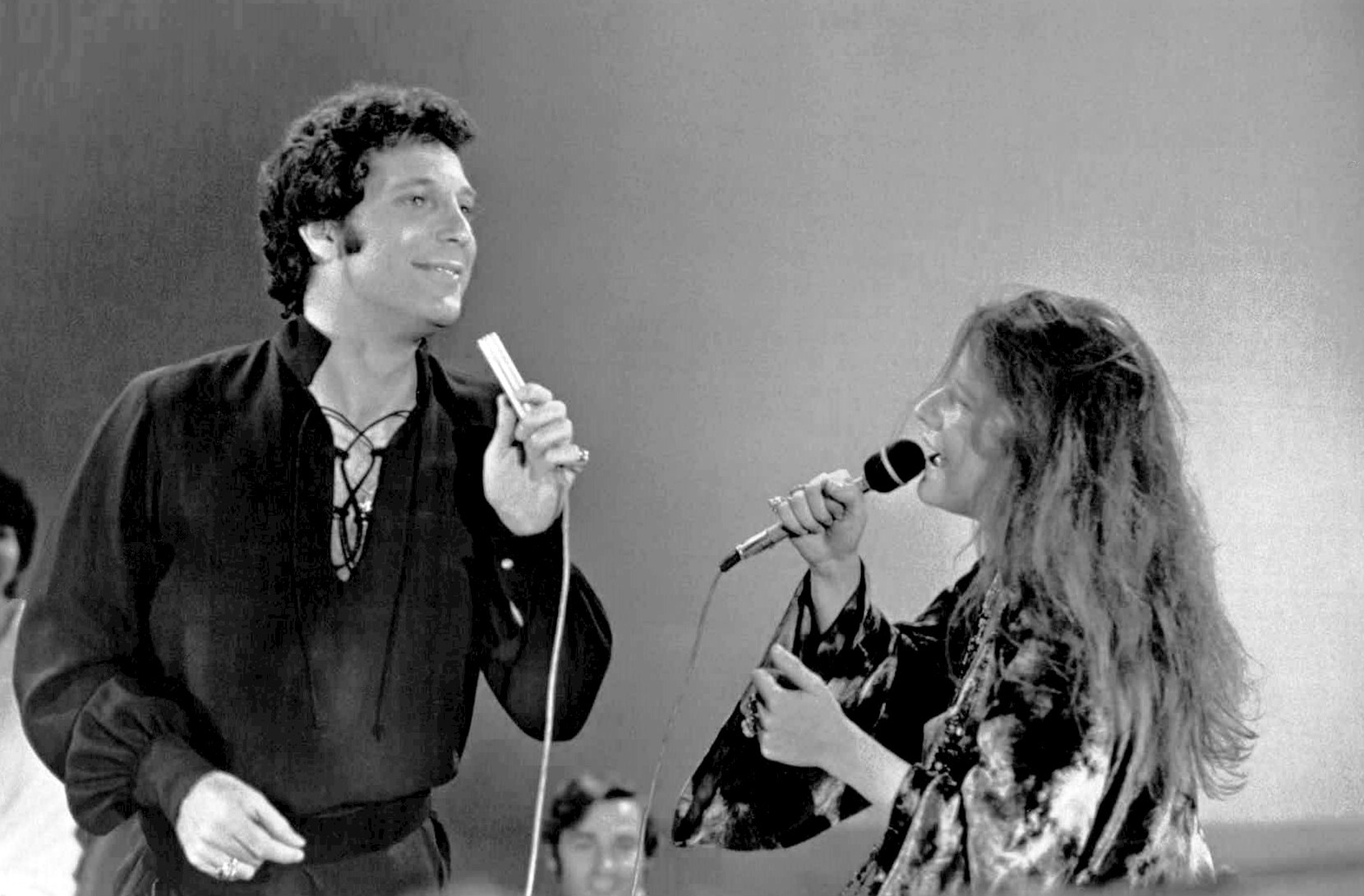
Tom Jones (pictured left, with Janis Joplin) had two of his three number-one singles in the 1960s; the third was in 2009.

Key
†	Best-selling single of the year
‡	Best-selling single of the decade

No.	Artist (Note: The artist, song name, dates and duration are those given by the Official Charts Company.)	Single	Record label (Note: The record labels are those given by the OCC.)	Week starting date (Note: Due to different charts being used, the weekday varies prior to August 1969: Chart week starting Friday before 10 March 1960 (NME), Thursday before July 1967 (Record Retailer), Wednesday before August 1969, and chart week ending Saturday after that (BMRB). These are the dates by which the charts are usually referred to and so are the dates used in this table.)	Weeks at number one
1960
94	Emile Ford and the Checkmates	"What Do You Want to Make Those Eyes at Me For?"	Pye	18 December 1959	6
95	Michael Holliday	"Starry Eyed"	Columbia	29 January 1960	1
96	Anthony Newley	"Why"	Decca	5 February 1960	4
97	Adam Faith	"Poor Me"	Parlophone	3 March 1960	2
98	Johnny Preston	"Running Bear"	Mercury	17 March 1960	2
99	Lonnie Donegan	"My Old Man's a Dustman"	Pye	31 March 1960	4
100	Anthony Newley	"Do You Mind?"	Decca	28 April 1960	1
101	The Everly Brothers	"Cathy's Clown"	Warner Bros.	5 May 1960	7
102	Eddie Cochran	"Three Steps to Heaven"	London	23 June 1960	2
103	Jimmy Jones	"Good Timin'"	MGM	7 July 1960	3
104	Cliff Richard and the Shadows	"Please Don't Tease"	Columbia	28 July 1960	1
105	Johnny Kidd and the Pirates	"Shakin' All Over"	His Master's Voice	4 August 1960	1
re	Cliff Richard and the Shadows	"Please Don't Tease"	Columbia	11 August 1960	2
106	The Shadows	"Apache"	Columbia	25 August 1960	5
107	Ricky Valance	"Tell Laura I Love Her"	Columbia	29 September 1960	3
108	Roy Orbison	"Only the Lonely"	London	20 October 1960	2
109	Elvis Presley	"It's Now or Never" †	RCA	3 November 1960	8
110	Cliff Richard and the Shadows	"I Love You"	Columbia	29 December 1960	2
1961
111	Johnny Tillotson	"Poetry in Motion"	London	12 January 1961	2
112	Elvis Presley	"Are You Lonesome Tonight?"	RCA	26 January 1961	4
113	Petula Clark	"Sailor"	Pye	23 February 1961	1
114	The Everly Brothers	"Walk Right Back" / "Ebony Eyes"	Warner Bros.	2 March 1961	3
115	Elvis Presley	"Wooden Heart" †	RCA	23 March 1961	6
116	The Marcels	"Blue Moon"	Pye International	4 May 1961	2
117	Floyd Cramer	"On the Rebound"	RCA	18 May 1961	1
118	The Temperance Seven	"You're Driving Me Crazy"	Parlophone	25 May 1961	1
119	Elvis Presley	"Surrender"	RCA	1 June 1961	4
120	Del Shannon	"Runaway"	London	29 June 1961	3
121	The Everly Brothers	"Temptation"	Warner Bros.	20 July 1961	2
122	Eden Kane	"Well I Ask You"	Decca	3 August 1961	1
123	Helen Shapiro	"You Don't Know"	Columbia	10 August 1961	3
124	John Leyton	"Johnny Remember Me"	Top Rank	31 August 1961	3
125	Shirley Bassey	"Reach for the Stars" / "Climb Ev'ry Mountain"	Columbia	21 September 1961	1
re	John Leyton	"Johnny Remember Me"	Top Rank	28 September 1961	1
126	The Shadows	"Kon-Tiki"	Columbia	5 October 1961	1
127	The Highwaymen	"Michael"	His Master's Voice	12 October 1961	1
128	Helen Shapiro	"Walkin' Back to Happiness"	Columbia	19 October 1961	3
129	Elvis Presley	"(Marie's the Name) His Latest Flame" / "Little Sister"	RCA	9 November 1961	4
130	Frankie Vaughan	"Tower of Strength"	Philips	7 December 1961	3
131	Danny Williams	"Moon River"	His Master's Voice	28 December 1961	2
1962
132	Cliff Richard and the Shadows	"The Young Ones"	Columbia	11 January 1962	6
133	Elvis Presley	"Can't Help Falling in Love" / "Rock-A-Hula Baby"	RCA	22 February 1962	4
134	The Shadows	"Wonderful Land"	Columbia	22 March 1962	8
135	B. Bumble and the Stingers	"Nut Rocker"	Top Rank	17 May 1962	1
136	Elvis Presley	"Good Luck Charm"	RCA	24 May 1962	5
137	Mike Sarne with Wendy Richard	"Come Outside"	Parlophone	28 June 1962	2
138	Ray Charles	"I Can't Stop Loving You"	His Master's Voice	12 July 1962	2
139	Frank Ifield	"I Remember You" †	Columbia	26 July 1962	7
140	Elvis Presley	"She's Not You"	RCA	13 September 1962	3
141	The Tornados	"Telstar"	Decca	4 October 1962	5
142	Frank Ifield	"Lovesick Blues"	Columbia	8 November 1962	5
143	Elvis Presley	"Return to Sender"	RCA	13 December 1962	3
1963
144	Cliff Richard and the Shadows	"The Next Time" / "Bachelor Boy"	Columbia	3 January 1963	3
145	The Shadows	"Dance On!"	Columbia	24 January 1963	1
146	Jet Harris and Tony Meehan	"Diamonds"	Decca	31 January 1963	3
147	Frank Ifield	"The Wayward Wind"	Columbia	21 February 1963	3
148	Cliff Richard and the Shadows	"Summer Holiday"	Columbia	14 March 1963	2
149	The Shadows	"Foot Tapper"	Columbia	28 March 1963	1
re	Cliff Richard and the Shadows	"Summer Holiday"	Columbia	4 April 1963	1
150	Gerry and the Pacemakers	"How Do You Do It?"	Columbia	11 April 1963	3
151	The Beatles	"From Me to You"	Parlophone	2 May 1963	7
152	Gerry and the Pacemakers	"I Like It"	Columbia	20 June 1963	4
153	Frank Ifield	"Confessin'"	Columbia	18 July 1963	2
154	Elvis Presley	"(You're the) Devil in Disguise"	RCA	1 August 1963	1
155	The Searchers	"Sweets for My Sweet"	Pye	8 August 1963	2
156	Billy J. Kramer and the Dakotas	"Bad to Me"	Parlophone	22 August 1963	3
157	The Beatles	"She Loves You" ‡	Parlophone	12 September 1963	4
158	Brian Poole and the Tremeloes	"Do You Love Me"	Decca	10 October 1963	3
159	Gerry and the Pacemakers	"You'll Never Walk Alone"	Columbia	31 October 1963	4
re	The Beatles	"She Loves You" ‡	Parlophone	28 November 1963	2
160	The Beatles	"I Want to Hold Your Hand"	Parlophone	12 December 1963	5
1964
161	The Dave Clark Five	"Glad All Over"	Columbia	16 January 1964	2
162	The Searchers	"Needles and Pins"	Pye	30 January 1964	3
163	The Bachelors	"Diane"	Decca	20 February 1964	1
164	Cilla Black	"Anyone Who Had a Heart"	Parlophone	27 February 1964	3
165	Billy J. Kramer and the Dakotas	"Little Children"	Parlophone	19 March 1964	2
166	The Beatles	"Can't Buy Me Love" †	Parlophone	2 April 1964	3
167	Peter and Gordon	"A World Without Love"	Columbia	23 April 1964	2
168	The Searchers	"Don't Throw Your Love Away"	Pye	7 May 1964	2
169	The Four Pennies	"Juliet"	Philips	21 May 1964	1
170	Cilla Black	"You're My World"	Parlophone	28 May 1964	4
171	Roy Orbison	"It's Over"	London	25 June 1964	2
172	The Animals	"The House of the Rising Sun"	Columbia	9 July 1964	1
173	The Rolling Stones	"It's All Over Now"	Decca	16 July 1964	1
174	The Beatles	"A Hard Day's Night"	Parlophone	23 July 1964	3
175	Manfred Mann	"Do Wah Diddy Diddy"	His Master's Voice	13 August 1964	2
176	The Honeycombs	"Have I the Right?"	Pye	27 August 1964	2
177	The Kinks	"You Really Got Me"	Pye	10 September 1964	2
178	Herman's Hermits	"I'm Into Something Good"	Columbia	24 September 1964	2
179	Roy Orbison	"Oh, Pretty Woman"	London	8 October 1964	2
180	Sandie Shaw	"(There's) Always Something There to Remind Me"	Pye	22 October 1964	3
re	Roy Orbison	"Oh, Pretty Woman"	London	12 November 1964	1
181	The Supremes	"Baby Love"	Stateside	19 November 1964	2
182	The Rolling Stones	"Little Red Rooster"	Decca	3 December 1964	1
183	The Beatles	"I Feel Fine"	Parlophone	10 December 1964	5
1965
184	Georgie Fame and the Blue Flames	"Yeh, Yeh"	Columbia	14 January 1965	2
185	The Moody Blues	"Go Now"	Decca	28 January 1965	1
186	The Righteous Brothers	"You've Lost That Lovin' Feelin'"	London	4 February 1965	2
187	The Kinks	"Tired of Waiting for You"	Pye	18 February 1965	1
188	The Seekers	"I'll Never Find Another You"	Columbia	25 February 1965	2
189	Tom Jones	"It's Not Unusual"	Decca	11 March 1965	1
190	The Rolling Stones	"The Last Time"	Decca	18 March 1965	3
191	Unit 4 + 2	"Concrete and Clay"	Decca	8 April 1965	1
192	Cliff Richard	"The Minute You're Gone"	Columbia	15 April 1965	1
193	The Beatles	"Ticket to Ride"	Parlophone	22 April 1965	3
194	Roger Miller	"King of the Road"	Philips	13 May 1965	1
195	Jackie Trent	"Where Are You Now"	Pye	20 May 1965	1
196	Sandie Shaw	"Long Live Love"	Pye	27 May 1965	3
197	Elvis Presley	"Crying in the Chapel"	RCA	17 June 1965	1
198	The Hollies	"I'm Alive"	Parlophone	24 June 1965	1
re	Elvis Presley	"Crying in the Chapel"	RCA	1 July 1965	1
re	The Hollies	"I'm Alive"	Parlophone	8 July 1965	2
199	The Byrds	"Mr. Tambourine Man"	CBS	22 July 1965	2
200	The Beatles	"Help!"	Parlophone	5 August 1965	3
201	Sonny & Cher	"I Got You Babe"	Atlantic	26 August 1965	2
202	The Rolling Stones	"(I Can't Get No) Satisfaction"	Decca	9 September 1965	2
203	The Walker Brothers	"Make It Easy on Yourself"	Philips	23 September 1965	1
204	Ken Dodd	"Tears" †	Columbia	30 September 1965	5
205	The Rolling Stones	"Get Off of My Cloud"	Decca	4 November 1965	3
206	The Seekers	"The Carnival Is Over"	Columbia	25 November 1965	3
207	The Beatles	"Day Tripper" / "We Can Work It Out"	Parlophone	16 December 1965	5
1966
208	The Spencer Davis Group	"Keep On Running"	Fontana	20 January 1966	1
209	The Overlanders	"Michelle"	Pye	27 January 1966	3
210	Nancy Sinatra	"These Boots Are Made for Walkin'"	Reprise	17 February 1966	4
211	The Walker Brothers	"The Sun Ain't Gonna Shine Anymore"	Philips	17 March 1966	4
212	The Spencer Davis Group	"Somebody Help Me"	Fontana	14 April 1966	2
213	Dusty Springfield	"You Don't Have to Say You Love Me"	Philips	28 April 1966	1
214	Manfred Mann	"Pretty Flamingo"	His Master's Voice	5 May 1966	3
215	The Rolling Stones	"Paint It Black"	Decca	26 May 1966	1
216	Frank Sinatra	"Strangers in the Night"	Reprise	2 June 1966	3
217	The Beatles	"Paperback Writer"	Parlophone	23 June 1966	2
218	The Kinks	"Sunny Afternoon"	Pye	7 July 1966	2
219	Georgie Fame and the Blue Flames	"Get Away"	Columbia	21 July 1966	1
220	Chris Farlowe	"Out of Time"	Immediate	28 July 1966	1
221	The Troggs	"With a Girl Like You"	Fontana	4 August 1966	2
222	The Beatles	"Yellow Submarine" / "Eleanor Rigby"	Parlophone	18 August 1966	4
223	Small Faces	"All or Nothing"	Decca	15 September 1966	1
224	Jim Reeves	"Distant Drums"	RCA	22 September 1966	5
225	Four Tops	"Reach Out I'll Be There"	Tamla Motown	27 October 1966	3
226	The Beach Boys	"Good Vibrations"	Capitol	17 November 1966	2
227	Tom Jones	"Green, Green Grass of Home" †	Decca	1 December 1966	7
1967
228	The Monkees	"I'm a Believer"	RCA	19 January 1967	4
229	Petula Clark	"This Is My Song"	Pye	16 February 1967	2
230	Engelbert Humperdinck	"Release Me" †	Decca	2 March 1967	6
231	Frank and Nancy Sinatra	"Somethin' Stupid"	Reprise	13 April 1967	2
232	Sandie Shaw	"Puppet on a String"	Pye	27 April 1967	3
233	The Tremeloes	"Silence Is Golden"	CBS	18 May 1967	3
234	Procol Harum	"A Whiter Shade of Pale"	Deram	8 June 1967	6
235	The Beatles	"All You Need Is Love"	Parlophone	19 July 1967	3
236	Scott McKenzie	"San Francisco (Be Sure to Wear Flowers in Your Hair)"	CBS	9 August 1967	4
237	Engelbert Humperdinck	"The Last Waltz"	Decca	6 September 1967	5
238	Bee Gees	"Massachusetts"	Polydor	11 October 1967	4
239	The Foundations	"Baby Now That I've Found You"	Pye	8 November 1967	2
240	Long John Baldry	"Let the Heartaches Begin"	Pye	22 November 1967	2
241	The Beatles	"Hello, Goodbye"	Parlophone	6 December 1967	7
1968
242	Georgie Fame	"The Ballad of Bonnie and Clyde"	CBS	24 January 1968	1
243	Love Affair	"Everlasting Love"	CBS	31 January 1968	2
244	Manfred Mann	"Mighty Quinn"	Fontana	14 February 1968	2
245	Esther & Abi Ofarim	"Cinderella Rockefella"	Philips	28 February 1968	3
246	Dave Dee, Dozy, Beaky, Mick & Tich	"The Legend of Xanadu"	Fontana	20 March 1968	1
247	The Beatles	"Lady Madonna"	Parlophone	27 March 1968	2
248	Cliff Richard	"Congratulations"	Columbia	10 April 1968	2
249	Louis Armstrong	"What a Wonderful World"	His Master's Voice	24 April 1968	4
250	Gary Puckett and the Union Gap	"Young Girl"	CBS	22 May 1968	4
251	The Rolling Stones	"Jumpin' Jack Flash"	Decca	19 June 1968	2
252	The Equals	"Baby, Come Back"	President	3 July 1968	3
253	Des O'Connor	"I Pretend"	Columbia	24 July 1968	1
254	Tommy James and the Shondells	"Mony Mony"	Major Minor	31 July 1968	2
255	The Crazy World of Arthur Brown	"Fire"	Track	14 August 1968	1
re	Tommy James and the Shondells	"Mony Mony"	Major Minor	21 August 1968	1
256	The Beach Boys	"Do It Again"	Capitol	28 August 1968	1
257	Bee Gees	"I've Gotta Get a Message to You"	Polydor	4 September 1968	1
258	The Beatles	"Hey Jude" †	Apple	11 September 1968	2
259	Mary Hopkin	"Those Were the Days"	Apple	25 September 1968	6
260	Joe Cocker	"With a Little Help from My Friends"	Regal Zonophone	6 November 1968	1
261	Hugo Montenegro	"The Good, the Bad and the Ugly"	RCA	13 November 1968	4
262	The Scaffold	"Lily the Pink"	Parlophone	11 December 1968	3
1969
263	Marmalade	"Ob-La-Di, Ob-La-Da"	CBS	1 January 1969	1
re	The Scaffold	"Lily the Pink"	Parlophone	8 January 1969	1
re	Marmalade	"Ob-La-Di, Ob-La-Da"	CBS	15 January 1969	2
264	Fleetwood Mac	"Albatross"	Blue Horizon	29 January 1969	1
265	The Move	"Blackberry Way"	Regal Zonophone	5 February 1969	1
266	Amen Corner	"(If Paradise Is) Half as Nice"	Immediate	12 February 1969	2
267	Peter Sarstedt	"Where Do You Go To (My Lovely)?"	United Artists	26 February 1969	4
268	Marvin Gaye	"I Heard It Through the Grapevine"	Tamla Motown	26 March 1969	3
269	Desmond Dekker and the Aces	"Israelites"	Pyramid	16 April 1969	1
270	The Beatles with Billy Preston	"Get Back"	Apple	23 April 1969	6
271	Tommy Roe	"Dizzy"	Stateside	4 June 1969	1
272	The Beatles	"The Ballad of John and Yoko"	Apple	11 June 1969	3
273	Thunderclap Newman	"Something in the Air"	Track	2 July 1969	3
274	The Rolling Stones	"Honky Tonk Women"	Decca	23 July 1969	5
275	Zager and Evans	"In the Year 2525"	RCA	24 August 1969	3
276	Creedence Clearwater Revival	"Bad Moon Rising"	Liberty	14 September 1969	3
277	Jane Birkin and Serge Gainsbourg	"Je t'aime... moi non plus"	Major Minor	5 October 1969	1
278	Bobbie Gentry	"I'll Never Fall in Love Again"	Capitol	12 October 1969	1
279	The Archies	"Sugar, Sugar" †	RCA	19 October 1969	8
280	Rolf Harris	"Two Little Boys"	Columbia	14 December 1969	6

== By artist ==
The following artists achieved three or more number-one hits during the 1960s.

Artist	Number ones	Weeks at number one
The Beatles	17	69
Elvis Presley	11	44
The Rolling Stones	8	18
Cliff Richard	7	20
The Shadows	5	16
Frank Ifield	4	17
The Everly Brothers	3	12
Gerry and the Pacemakers	3	11
Sandie Shaw	3	9
Manfred Mann	3	7
Roy Orbison	3	7
The Searchers	3	7
The Kinks	3	5
Georgie Fame	3	4

== By record label ==
The following record labels had five or more number ones on the UK Singles Chart during the 1960s.

Record label	Number ones
Columbia	35
Parlophone	23
Decca	22
Pye/Pye International	19
RCA	17
CBS	7
London	7
His Master's Voice	7
Philips	7
Fontana	5

== Million-selling and gold records ==
The Shadows instrumental, "Apache", is the oldest 1960s release to be awarded a gold record but not the first to actually receive the award. The awarding of seventeen gold records to records released in the 1960s is documented and, notably, five were awarded to releases by The Beatles. Although The Righteous Brothers first released "Unchained Melody" in August 1965, it had more success after being re-released in the 1990s, reaching number one and selling more than one million copies.

Artist	Song	Year of millionth sale
The Shadows	"Apache"	1963
Elvis Presley	"It's Now or Never"	1960
Acker Bilk	"Stranger on the Shore"	1962
Cliff Richard and The Shadows	"The Young Ones"	1962
Frank Ifield	"I Remember You"	1962
The Beatles	"She Loves You"	1963
The Beatles	"I Want to Hold Your Hand"	1963
The Beatles	"Can't Buy Me Love"	1964
The Beatles	"I Feel Fine"	1964
Ken Dodd	"Tears"	1965
The Seekers	"The Carnival Is Over"	1965
The Beatles	"Day Tripper" / "We Can Work It Out"	1965–66
Tom Jones	"Green, Green Grass of Home"	1966
Engelbert Humperdinck	"Release Me"	1967
Engelbert Humperdinck	"The Last Waltz"	1967
Cliff Richard	"Congratulations"	1968
The Archies	"Sugar, Sugar"	1970.
