= Vivabeat =

Techno-pop band (1978–1983)

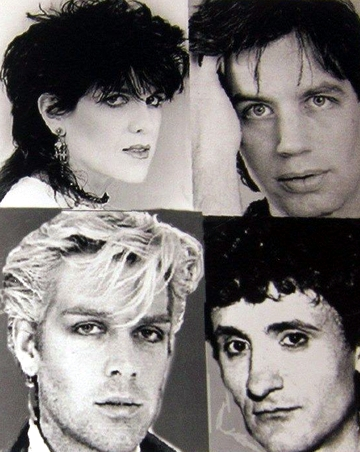
- Vivabeat members, left to right (top row); Marina Muhlfriedel, Mick Muhlfriedel left to right (bottom row); Terrance Robay, Rob Dean

Background information
- Genres: Techno-pop
- Years active: 1978–1983
- Label: Charisma - 1980
- Website: vivabeat.net

Vivabeat was a Los Angeles-based techno-pop band founded in 1978 and active into the mid-1980s. It is best known for being discovered by and signed to its first record deal at the request of Peter Gabriel. It became the first American band on Tony Stratton Smith's British label, Charisma Records. The band released one album for Charisma Records, Party in the War Zone. The album included one of the band's most successful songs, "Man from China." The song became a Top 20 charted dance club hit in the United States, Europe, and Asia. "Man from China" also appears on the Charisma Label/Various Masterpieces album – The Sounds Album Volume 6, released in 1980.

== History ==
=== Formation ===
Co-founding member, Marina Muhlfriedel (Marina del Rey) first met Peter Gabriel while working as a rock journalist. She later gave Peter a copy of the band’s demo tape, which included the song “Man from China.” Peter shared the demo with his label, Charisma Records, which released one album by Vivabeat, Party in the War Zone. The song "Man from China" contains a whistled tune that inspired the recording of Games Without Frontiers which also has a whistled melody.

"Man from China"
Sample of Vivabeat's "Man from China" from Party in the War Zone album (1980).

"The House Is Burning"
Sample of Vivabeat's "The House Is Burning" from an E.P produced by Earle Mankey (1981).

"What We Talk About"
Sample of Vivabeat's "What We Talk About (when we talk about love)" from The Good Life album (2001)

Prior to Vivabeat, guitarist Alec Murphy, a Berklee College of Music graduate, played with the Boston New Wave band Human Sexual Response. Drummer Doug Orilio performed in another Boston band, Reddy Teddy. Bass player and primary songwriter, Mick Muhlfriedel managed Strawberry Records in Cambridge, Massachusetts. Keyboard player and vocalist Marina del Rey (Marina Muhlfriedel) was previously a founding member of the seminal L.A. girl punk band Backstage Pass, a rock journalist, and entertainment editor of Teen Magazine.

== Career ==
Vivabeat’s second release was a limited edition, eponymous titled E.P., featuring the production work of Earle Mankey and guitarist Rob Dean who had previously played in the band Japan. The E.P. contained the song "The House is Burning (but there’s no one home)," which was featured, along with the music video, in Brian DePalma’s film, Body Double. The video directed by Derek Chang, won an MTV award for Best Video from a New Band.

=== Dissolution ===
As Vivabeat began to wind down in 1983, Terrance Robay went to Germany, to co-star with Dennis Hopper in White Star, a feature film produced by Roger Corman and directed by Roland Klick (released in the US as Let It Rock). Marina Muhlfriedel, veered into the film business and served as a producer on the War of the Roses, Throw Momma from the Train, and other projects. Mick Muhlfriedel became a film and television composer, including the score for the Emmy-winning documentary Natural History of the Chicken by Mark Lewis. Mick continues to produce other artists and compose and release songs under his Buff Roshi moniker.

=== Aftermath ===
Post-Vivabeat, Rob Dean played with Gary Numan, Sinead O’Connor, Illustrated Man, Slow Club, and most recently, Light of Day. He now lives in Costa Rica and is an artist specializing in bird paintings.

In 2001, Permanent Press Records issued a best of Vivabeat album titled The Good Life 1979-1986. The volume also included several tracks from See Jane Run, a side project featuring Marina del Rey (Marina Muhlfriedel), Cindy Hope, and Peggy Max on vocals.

In 2024, Rubellan Remasters released two retrospectives. The first was a CD reissue (the first such) of Party in the War Zone. It included the remastered original recordings and 10 bonus tracks. The second was a vinyl-only album titled The House Is Burning: The Best of Vivabeat.

Two more Vivabeat releases were slated for 2025, this time from Liberation Hall: a CD version of The House is Burning: The Best of Vivabeat (1979-1989) out June 6, expanded from the vinyl edition with three songs that were previously unreleased; and a version of Party in the War Zone called Party in the War Zone Expanded out July 11.

Three original members of Vivabeat died of AIDS — Alec Murphy in 1986, Connie DiSilva in 1991, and Terrance Robay in 1994. Original drummer Doug Orilio died in 2021 from complications related to a motorcycle accident, years earlier. Guitarist Jeff Gilbert has also passed away.

== Members ==
=== Original Band Members ===
Terrance Robay – vocals, Marina del Rey (Marina Muhlfriedel) – keyboards and vocals, Connie DiSilva – keyboards and vocals, Mick Muhlfriedel – bass guitar, Alec Murphy – guitar, Doug Orilio – drums.

=== Later Additions and Replacements ===
Rob Dean – guitar, Steve Lynch – guitar, Jeff Gilbert – guitar, Chris Schendel – drums, Don Romine - Drums - Electronic Drums - Programing Roger Mason – keyboards, Cindy Hope and Peggy Max – vocals.
