= Adolescent Sex =

Studio album by Japan
- Released: March 1978
- Recorded: Late 1977
- Genre: Glam rock; funk rock; disco-rock; synth-pop
- Length: 47:24
- Label: Hansa
- Producer: Ray Singer

Japan chronology
Adolescent Sex (1978)	Obscure Alternatives (1978)

Singles from Adolescent Sex
- 1. "Don't Rain on My Parade" Released: 31 March 1978; 2. "Adolescent Sex" Released: 3 April 1978 (EU); 3. "The Unconventional" Released: 25 August 1978

Adolescent Sex is the debut album by the English band Japan, released in March 1978 by record label Hansa. To avoid controversy over the title, the album was renamed simply as Japan in some countries.

== Content ==
According to AllMusic, Adolescent Sex "snarls with leftover punk intent, a few glam rock riffs, and a wealth of electronics that not only reach back to the band's youth, but also predate much of what would explode out of the next wave of British underground."

== Release ==
Though not a commercial success in their native UK, the album was better received abroad, particularly in Japan itself, where it peaked at No. 20, and in the Netherlands where the single "Adolescent Sex" reached number 27 in the Dutch Top 40 in 1979.

The Japanese release contained several mistranslations of song titles. "Transmission" became "Invitation to Fascination", "Suburban Love" became "Carousel of Love", and "Television" became "Temptation Screen".

The album was remastered and re-released as a digipak CD in April 2004, with four videos as bonus material.

== Reception and aftermath ==
Professional ratings
Review scores
Source	Rating
AllMusic	4.5/5 stars
Encyclopedia of Popular Music	2/5 stars
Trouser Press	unfavourable

Trouser Press wrote that the album "introduces Japan in all its guitar-rock misery, playing such Bowie-influenced tripe as 'Wish You Were Black' with less style than a sense of urgency". AllMusic retrospectively gave the album a 4.5 out of 5 grade, writing: "A more exciting album than just about anything else they'd ever record, Japan were young, hungry, and more than a little rough around the edges."

Within a couple of years of its release, the band publicly denounced the album.

"The band were not totally happy with the first album or the way it had been marketed, and were dismayed by its poor reception in the UK. Their record company were not that ecstatic with the British sales either and required another album, this time aimed at the lucrative US and European markets."

— Paul Rymer

David Sylvian also said in 1982:

"I regret the first album, 'Adolescent Sex', in the sense that we were too young, too naive to make it. The people around us should have realised that and not had it released. The second album is okay as a first album."

== Track listing ==
All tracks are written by David Sylvian, except for "Don't Rain on My Parade" by Jule Styne and Bob Merrill.

Side one
No.	Title	Length
1.	"Transmission"	4:46
2.	"The Unconventional"	3:02
3.	"Wish You Were Black"	4:49
4.	"Performance"	4:36
5.	"Lovers on Main Street"	4:09
6.	"Don't Rain on My Parade"	2:54

Side two
No.	Title	Length
7.	"Suburban Love"	7:27
8.	"Adolescent Sex"	3:46
9.	"Communist China"	2:44
10.	"Television"	9:15

Bonus material on 2004 remastered re-release
No.	Title	Length
11.	"Don't Rain on My Parade" (video)
12.	"Communist China" (video)
13.	"Adolescent Sex" (video)
14.	"Adolescent Sex" (rare alt. video)

== Personnel ==
Japan

- David Sylvian – lead vocals, rhythm guitar
- Rob Dean – lead guitar, backing vocals
- Richard Barbieri – keyboards, backing vocals
- Mick Karn – bass, backing vocals
- Steve Jansen – drums, backing vocals, percussion

Additional personnel

- Ray Singer – production, additional backing vocals
- Pete Silver – engineering
- Dick Whitbread – cover design and artwork
- Graham Hughes – cover photo

== Charts ==
=== Album ===
Year	Chart	Peak position
1978	Japanese Oricon Albums Chart	20

=== Singles ===
Year	Single	Chart	Peak position
1979	Adolescent Sex	Dutch Top 100	21
1979	Adolescent Sex	Belgium (Flanders) Ultratop	28
