= Backstage Pass (band) =

Los Angeles pop-punk band

- Origin: Los Angeles, California
- Years active: 1976–1979

Backstage Pass was a pop-punk band from Los Angeles. The group was one of the earliest punk bands from Los Angeles and helped to launch The Masque, an iconic punk rock club in Hollywood.

== History ==
The band was formed in 1976 as a mostly female pop-punk band. Marina Muhlfriedel (Marina del Rey) started Backstage Pass with original bass player Joanna Spock Dean and guitarist, Genny Schorr (Genny Body).

Prior to moving to the Masque, Backstage Pass first rehearsed upstairs at Cherokee Studios in West Hollywood while Alice Cooper, David Bowie, and others recorded in the downstairs studios. After several months, Stiff Records' founder Jake Riviera, hosted a showcase for the band which led to their performing extensively in Southern and Northern California on bills with bands including Devo, The Mumps, Wall of Voodoo, The Nuns, Elvis Costello, The Screamers, The Weirdos, and more.

Before there was much media presence, the group was announced in Britain’s Melody Maker and Sounds music newspapers and in Rodney Bingenheimer’s Phonograph Record Magazine. Holly Beth Vincent and Ché Zuro were also key members of the band. The band went through various iterations, all of which featured female players with the exception of a few male drummers. The longest-serving drummer with Backstage Pass was Rod "The Perve" Mitchell. Additionally performing in various lineups were Hilly Michaels and Mike Ruiz from Milk n' Cookies.

== Dissolution ==
Backstage Pass dissolved in 1979. Marina co-founded Vivabeat, a techno-pop band signed by Peter Gabriel to Charisma Records. Holly Beth Vincent formed the band, Holly and The Italians in 1978. Ché Zuro became a member of The Orchids, formed by Kim Fowley. Before joining Backstage Pass, Genny Schorr was in the discussion to join the Runaways. Eventually, she rejected a role in The Go-Go’s as she was co-owner of Strait Jacket, a punk fashion store. She went on to join the cowpunk band, Screamin’ Sirens with Pleasant Gehman. Spock continued to perform with several local bands as a bass player and percussionist. In November 1999, Virgin Records America announced her as senior director of video promotion in New York.

== Reunion ==
On November 11, 2018, about forty years after dissolving the original group, a Backstage Pass reboot performed at a Radio Free Hollywood Reunion with numerous other local bands from the late '70s era. The new incarnation featured original members Marina del Rey (Marina Muhlfriedel) and Genny Schorr, along with bass player, Gwynne Kahn, guitarist, Jessie Jacobson, drummer, Chris Bailey, and keyboard/vocalist, Karen Benjamin, all veteran members of the L.A. music scene. Since then, the band has taken on a new life, occasionally playing shows and developing new material.

In 2019, Semi-Pro Records, an independent label in East Nashville, released a limited-edition Backstage Pass '77 pink collector's cassette of live and studio tracks from the late 70s. Two years later, in 2021, Genny and Marina were featured in a Dr. Martens' documentary about the History of Women in L.A. Punk, along with Exene Cervenka, Patty Schemel of Hole, The Linda Lindas, and L.A. Witch.

== In popular culture ==
The group's history and role in the early Los Angeles punk rock scene is documented in books including: Genny Schorr’s memoir, All Roads Lead To Punk on Hozac, Hit Girls: Women of Punk in the USA, 1975-1983 by Jen B Larson, More Fun in the New World and Under the Big Black Sky by John Doe of the band X, Ask the Angels by Donna Santisi, Be Stiff: The Stiff Records Story by Richard Balls, Punk '77: An Inside Look at the San Francisco Rock n' Roll Scene, by James Stark, Live at the Masque: Nightmare in Punk Alley by Brendan Mullen, Hard + Fast by Melanie Nissen and others. Backstage Pass appeared also in numerous punk publications of the era including Backdoor Man, Slash Magazine, and Flipside.

One of the band’s songs, “Legend (Come on Up to Me),” is included on the Rhino Records compilation, Saturday Night Pogo, released in 1978. The song was also covered by the band, Redd Kross in the movie Desperate Teenage Lovedolls with Joanna Spock Dean singing lead.

In 2020, Backstage Pass was also included on the Heavy Soul Records compilation CD, It's a Youth Explosion Volume 1 with its song, "Let Me Show You Love."

In 2025 a limited edition 45 of Backstage Pass, “ Legend (Come on up to me) and Let Me Show You Love was included in Genny Schorr’s memoir, All Roads Lead To Punk.
