= Peter Sarstedt =

British singer-songwriter (1941–2017)

- Sarstedt in 1969

Background information
- Also known as: Peter Lincoln (briefly recorded as in 1967)
- Born: Peter Eardley Sarstedt; 10 December 1941; New Delhi, British India
- Origin: Croydon, London, England
- Died: 8 January 2017 (aged 75) Sussex, England
- Genres: Folk; pop
- Occupations: Singer-songwriter, musician
- Instruments: Vocals; guitar
- Years active: 1960–1965 (as member of The Saints") 1969–2010 (as sololist and "Sarstedt Brothers" groups)
- Labels: United Artists; Island Records; Angel Air; Singer Records; Warner

Peter Eardley Sarstedt (10 December 1941 – 8 January 2017) was a British singer-songwriter and instrumentalist. He was the brother of singers Eden Kane, a teenage pop idol, and Clive Sarstedt, with both of whom he also recorded and performed as The Sarstedt Brothers. The Sarstedts had the distinction of being the only family from which three siblings separately attained chart success without any of them ever charting as a combined act.

Although his music was classified as pop, it generally encompassed ballads derived from traditional folk music rather than traditional rock and roll. He is best known for writing and performing the song "Where Do You Go To (My Lovely)?", which topped the UK Singles Chart in 1969. Set to a "faux European waltz tune" and described as "a romantic novel in song", it won an Ivor Novello Award. The record remained Sarstedt's biggest hit. He had one more hit single and one hit album but despite numerous releases never had chart success again.

He released the album England's Lane in 1997, which continued the story of the fictional Marie-Claire in the song "The Last of the Breed"; a planned third installment titled "Farewell Marie-Claire" did not materialise.

Sarstedt continued to tour mainly in 1960s revival-type shows, until his retirement in 2010 due to ill health.

== Early life ==
Sarstedt was born, as one of six, in 1941, to English expatriates Albert James Sarstedt, an accountant and civil servant and his second wife Cora (née Byrne), in New Delhi in what was then British India. His ancestors were long resident in India; his ancestor Christian Ludwig Wilhelm Sarstedt, was born in 1841 in Hanover, Germany and migrated to India where he died in 1893. Both of his parents had trained as classical musicians.

After Indian independence from Britain in 1947, Sarstedt's parents managed a tea plantation in the Darjeeling district of West Bengal, where Sarstedt attended Victoria Boys' School, a boarding school in Kurseong. He later moved to Calcutta; in 1954, Sarstedt's father died and the family relocated to Britain, settling in south London just before the rock 'n' roll boom.

Sarstedt along with his two brothers Richard and Robin joined a skiffle group called "The Fabulous Five", before establishing a group in 1960 called "The Saints", with Richard as lead vocalist and Peter playing bass guitar, whilst Richard was the first of the brothers to also establish a solo career in his own right also in 1960 and changing his name to Eden Kane, and becoming a teen idol having a hit record with "Well I Ask You" the following year. Peter would follow his older brother establishing his music career in the late 1960s, whist his younger brother Robin known as Clive Sarstedt would have a hit record with "My Resistance is Low" in 1976.

The Sarstedts had the distinction of being the first family where three siblings all attained separate chart success.

== Career ==
=== Hit recordings ===
Sarstedt was best known for writing and performing his 1969 UK number one single, released on the United Artists label, "Where Do You Go To (My Lovely)?", a portrait of a poor-born girl, Marie-Claire, from Naples who becomes a member of the European jet set. The song topped the chart in 14 countries. and was awarded the 1970 Ivor Novello Award for Best Song Musically and Lyrically. He later cited his first wife, Anita, as the inspiration for the song.

Lovely followed his earlier single "I Am A Cathedral" which didn't attain chart success, and his debut self-titled vinyl LP album was released in 1969 and reached number eight on the British charts his follow-up single, "Frozen Orange Juice", reached number 10 in the UK in 1969. However, subsequent releases such as "Beirut" and "Take Off Your Clothes" failed to chart.

Another selection from the album Where Do You Go To (My Lovely)?, from which his single of the same title had been released, was an instrumental called "Overture". Sarstedt composed it in collaboration with Ian Green and Ray Singer and it was later used as the theme music for Keep America Beautiful's famous "Crying Indian" public service announcement, which starred Espera Oscar de Corti as Iron Eyes Cody.

=== Touring ===
In the 1980s and 1990s, Sarstedt frequently toured the southern UK as part of the "Solid Silver '60s" package tours, having returned to England after several years residing in Denmark. In the 1990s and 2000s, he continued to release new albums and tour. In 1997 he released the album England's Lane, which featured the follow-up to "Where Do You Go To", entitled "The Last of the Breed".

In October 2002, Sarstedt appeared in an episode of the ITV programme After They Were Famous, together with Peter Wyngarde and Emlyn Hughes.

In 2006, Sarstedt released an album of new material called On Song. He sang harmonies on "Don't Think Twice" and "The Last Thing on My Mind" on Canadian singer Peter Thompson's 2007 album, Taking a Dive (Heart First).

=== Popular culture ===
New interest was sparked in his music after "Where Do You Go To" was used in the 2007 Wes Anderson films Hotel Chevalier and The Darjeeling Limited. In 2012 a compilation of songs called Highlights—the Demos was released.

=== Later years ===
Sarstedt's final album, was a compilation released in 2013, was titled Restless Heart. It was produced by Ray Singer and the single and accompanying video, "Valentine", directed and produced by Lara Singer, was released on Singer Records. A third installment of "Where Do You Go To", continuing the story of Marie-Claire, to be titled "Farewell Marie-Claire", did not materialize. Sarstedt last performed live in 2010.

== Personal life and death ==
Sarstedt married Anita Atke, who was a dentist, in 1969 and moved to Denmark. The couple divorced five years later. His second wife was Joanna Meill. From 2013 he lived in a retirement home in Sussex, England. He had progressive supranuclear palsy (PSP), diagnosed in 2015, but originally misdiagnosed as dementia in 2013. He died on 8 January 2017 at the age of 75. He is survived by his wife and two adult children.

== Discography ==
=== Singles ===
Year	A-side	B-side	Label	UK Chart	US Chart	Notes
1967	"In the Day of My Youth"	"My Monkey Is a Junkie"	Major Minor MM520	–	–	as "Peter Lincoln"
1968	"I Must Go On"	"Mary Jane"	Island WIP-6028	–	–	
1968	"I Am a Cathedral"	"Blagged"	United Artists UP 2228	53 (Note: Chart position is from the official UK "Breakers List".)	–	
1969	"Where Do You Go To (My Lovely)?"	"Morning Mountain"	United Artists UP 2262; U.S.: World Pacific 77911	1	70	
1969	"Frozen Orange Juice"	"Arethusa Loser"	United Artists UP 35021; U.S.: World Pacific 77919	10	116	
1969	"As Though It Were a Movie"	"Take Off Your Clothes"	United Artists UP 35041	–	–	
1970	"Without Darkness"	"Step into the Candlelight"	United Artists UP 35075	–	–	
1971	"You're a Lady"	"Useless"	United Artists UP 35301	–	–	
1972	"Every Word You Say"	"What Makes One Man Feel"	United Artists UP 35369	–	–	
1973	"Chinese Restaurant"	"Beloved Illusions"	Regal Zonophone RZ 3081	–	–	Credited to The Sarstedt Brothers
1975	"Tall Tree"	"Mellowed Out"	Warner Bros. K 16575	–	–	
1978	"Beirut"	"Hollywood Sign"	Ariola/Hansa AHA 517	–	–	
1978	"You'll Never Be Alone Again"	"Waitress in the Whiskey"	Ariola/Hansa AHA 531	–	–	
1979	"Mulberry Dawn"	"I Am No Longer"	Ariola/Hansa AHA 537	–	–	
1979	"The Far Pavilions"	"Juli's Theme"	Monarch MON 04	–	–	
1981	"English Girls" / "Where Do You Go To (My Lovely)"	"Frozen Orange Juice"	Liberty BP 396	–	–	
1982	"Love Among the Ruins"	"Don Quixote"	Peach River BBPR 2	–	–	
1984	"Other People's Lives"	"You'll Never Be Alone Again"	Audiotrax ATX 4	–	–	
1986	"Hemingway"	"Don Quixote"	Filmtrax FRAME 102	–	–	
1987	"Suzanne"	"Stress"	Trax PTS 1	–	–	

=== Albums ===
Sarstedt issued 15 albums in his 50-year-long career.

Year	Title	Label	UK Albums Chart	Notes
1969	Peter Sarstedt	United Artists ULP 1219	8	
1969	As Though It Were a Movie	United Artists UAS 29037	–	
1971	Every Word You Say Is Written Down	United Artists UAS 29247	–	
1973	Worlds Apart Together	EMI SRZA8516	–	(credited to "The Sarstedt Brothers")
1975	Tall Tree	Warner K56129	–	
1979	Ps...	Ariola/Hansa AHAL8006	–	
1981	Up Date	Festival Records D 19106	–	
1986	Colors: Asia Minor	Music Maker CMMR923	–	(credited to Peter and Clive Sarstedt)
1987	Never Say Goodbye	TRAX PETER/_IMS/POLYGRAM	–	
1997	England's Lane	Roundtower Music RTMD89 – BMG	–	
2004	Singer/Songwriter	EMI 5762632	–	
2006	On Song	RMS Studios	–	(credited to Peter Sarstedt with Clive Sarstedt on guitar)
2008	The Lost Album	Singer SING 204	–	
2012	Highlights – the Demos		–	
2013	Restless Heart	Singer	–	

== See also ==
- List of artists who reached number one on the UK Singles Chart
- List of number-one singles in Australia during the 1960s
- List of performers on Top of the Pops
- United Artists Records
