= Rob Dean =

British musician (born 1955)

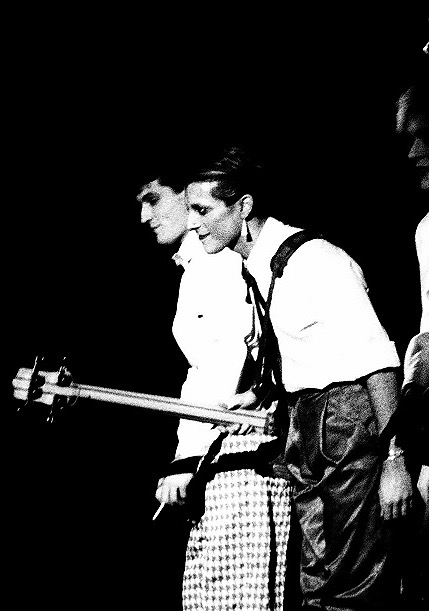
- Dean (left) with bandmate Mick Karn taking a curtain call, Nov 1982

Background information
- Also known as: Robert Dean
- Born: 23 April 1955 (age 71)
- Origin: Clapton, Hackney, England
- Genres: Glam rock; art rock; new wave; synth-pop
- Occupations: Musician; ornithologist
- Instruments: Guitar; vocals
- Years active: 1975–present
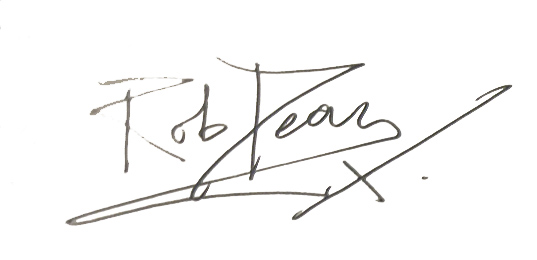
- Rob Dean's signature (c. 1980)

Robert Dean (born 23 April 1955) is a British musician turned professional illustrator, who rose to prominence playing lead guitar as a member of the English new wave band Japan from 1975 to 1981.

== Biography ==
He is from the Clapton district of Hackney, northeast London, England.

=== Japan ===
Dean joined Japan in 1975 at the age of 20. The band began as an alternative glam rock-style band and became a popular new wave sensation in the early 1980s. Dean left the band in May 1981 following 'The Art of Parties' tour, as his guitar work had become increasingly marginalised as they developed a more electronic sound.

He had previously played on their albums Adolescent Sex (1978), Obscure Alternatives (1978) and Quiet Life (1979). His last studio contributions were on the Gentlemen Take Polaroids album, released in November 1980. Dean left the band just prior to them achieving mainstream success, which lasted until they finally disbanded in December 1982.

=== Collaborations ===
After leaving Japan, he worked on initial ideas for a solo album with keyboardist and composer Roger Mason known for his work with Gary Numan, among others. He also contributed to Gary Numan's Dance album in 1981. He played on Sinéad O'Connor's first album The Lion and the Cobra in 1987 (on which he co-wrote one of the songs). Dean continued to work on projects with Steve Jansen, Richard Barbieri and Mick Karn such as a 1995 compilation album and a number of other works on their Medium Productions label.

== Other projects ==
=== Vivabeat ===
Vivabeat (supported by Peter Gabriel) combined the influences of 70s British art-rock with the kind of lush technopop performed by David Bowie, Roxy Music and Sparks. The band was the first American band signed to Charisma Records. The band had a worldwide hit with the track "Man From China" from their debut album Party in the War Zone. Dean played on the follow-up single, "The House is Burning (But There's No One Home)", which was featured on the band's self-titled EP. The "House is Burning" song and video (also featuring Dean) appeared in Brian DePalma's movie Body Double. In 2001 a 'best of' Vivabeat album titled The Good Life was released, with Dean's work on several tracks.

=== Illustrated Man ===
Dean formed Illustrated Man (1984) with Hugo Burnham (ex-Gang of Four), Roger Mason (Numan and others) and Australian singer/bassist Philip Foxman but their commercial success was limited.

=== The Slow Club's World of Wonders ===
Rob Dean contributed to this Australian band (1990)

=== Jansen, Barbieri, Karn ===
Beginning to Melt This 1993 album features Rob Dean and ex-members of Japan.

Little has been heard of Rob Dean as a musician since. The occasional demo tapes from the eighties have surfaced for a range of projects (known as 'The Lost Tapes') where Dean experimented with electronica (with Roger Mason), his trademark guitar sounds and even acoustic tracks with vocals.

== Present day ==
Dean's principal activity now is as a professional ornithology writer and artist on the birds of Central America. He lives in Monteverde, Costa Rica, and, now known as Robert Dean, has established a reputation as an expert on the region's birdlife. In 2007 Dean collaborated as illustrator on a field guide (along with author Richard Garrigues), entitled The Birds of Costa Rica: A Field Guide, and in 2010 (with author George Angehr) on The Birds of Panama: A Field Guide. He has been reported as occasionally playing guitar with local bands including Monteverde's rock band Chanchos de Monte, fronted by Alan Masters.

More recently Robert has formed a group named 'Light of Day' with Isaac Moraga, they released the singles Tomorrow never knows and Suddenly in 2019 and March 29th 2020 respectively. Their debut album Dimensions was completed in 2019 and was released on July 12th 2020. A Spanish language E.P was released on November 6th 2020 called La Inmensidad E.P.
