= Where Do You Go To (My Lovely)? =

1969 song by Peter Sarstedt

Single by Peter Sarstedt

from the album Peter Sarstedt
- B-side: Morning Mountain
- Released: January 1969
- Genre: Folk; pop; waltz
- Length: 5:23 (album version); 4:40 (single version)
- Label: United Artists
- Songwriter: Peter Sarstedt
- Producer: Ray Singer

Peter Sarstedt singles chronology
"I am a Cathedral" (1968)	"Where Do You Go To (My Lovely)?" (1969)	"Frozen Orange Juice" (1969)

Official audio
- "Where Do You Go To (My Lovely)?" on YouTube

"Where Do You Go To (My Lovely)?" is a song by the British singer-songwriter Peter Sarstedt. Its recording was produced by Ray Singer, engineered by John Mackswith at Lansdowne Recording Studios and released in 1969. The music has been described as "a faux European waltz tune", and the arrangement is a very simple one of strummed acoustic guitar and upright bass, with brief bursts of French-style accordion at the start and the end. The arranger and conductor was Ian Green.

== Lyrics ==
The song is about a fictional girl named Marie-Claire who grows up on the poverty-stricken backstreets of Naples, becomes a member of the jet set, and goes on to live in Paris. The lyrics describe her from the perspective of a childhood friend; it is left unclear whether they have remained close. The rhetorical question of the title suggests that her glamorous lifestyle might not have brought Marie-Claire happiness or contentment.

Even though Sarstedt himself was not French, the song benefited from the contemporary awareness in Britain of such singers as the French Serge Gainsbourg and Jacques Brel (Belgium-born of Flemish descent).

The lyrics contain a large number of contemporary and other references, making the song a time capsule of the 1960s decade.

- Marlene Dietrich: German–American actress and singer
- Zizi Jeanmaire: French ballerina
- Pierre Balmain: French designer of elegant fashions
- Boulevard Saint-Michel: street in the Latin Quarter of Paris
- The Rolling Stones: British rock and roll band
- Sacha Distel: French singer and musician
- Sorbonne: University of Paris
- Picasso: Spanish pioneer of modern art
- Juan-les-Pins: fashionable beach resort on the French Riviera
- Topless swimsuit: first conceived by Austrian American fashion designer Rudi Gernreich in 1964
- Saint Moritz: fashionable ski resort in the Engadin, Swiss Alps
- Napoleon brandy: a blended brandy in which the youngest brandy of the blend has been aged for at least six years
- Aga Khan: Islamic leader and racehorse owner

The version on the album Peter Sarstedt is longer than the radio edit version released as a single, having extra stanzas beginning "You go to the embassy parties ..." and "You're in between twenty and thirty....". The difference in length between the two versions is approximately 30 seconds.

== Inspiration ==
It is often suspected that the name Marie-Claire is inspired by Marie Claire magazine, a women's fashion weekly that began in 1937 in France. One theory says that the song is about the Italian actress Sophia Loren, who was abandoned by her father and had a poverty-stricken childhood in Naples. Another theory has the song being inspired by Danish singer and actress Nina van Pallandt.

According to Alan Cooper: "Sarstedt insisted it was not written with actress Sophia Loren in mind. 'Yes, it's a portrait of a poor-born girl who becomes a member of the European jet set. And yes, there's reference to her growing up on the "back streets of Naples", so I can see why people may think it was written with Sophia Loren in mind. But that's just a coincidence. I really wasn't thinking of anyone specific.'"

The song was written in Copenhagen.

In 2009, Sarstedt spoke to a gossip columnist for the Daily Express. He admitted he had lied about the song being about a socialite who died in a fire. He said that, if it was about any one person, then the song was about his girlfriend at the time, Anita Atke, a Danish dental student, whom he had met in 1966 while busking in Paris. The two married in 1969 and divorced in 1974.

== Reception ==
John Bush of allmusic called the song "an exquisite piece of Baroque pop that Sarstedt would never come close to equaling again" and said that the song "blended the reserve of early British singer/songwriter with the sophistication of Continental pop."

The song was a hit far exceeding Sarstedt's other work, although he is not a one-hit wonder. In 1998 he was earning £60,000 annually in royalties from it.

DJ John Peel once said in an interview with New Musical Express that he considered this song the worst of all time.

The song was used as a soundtrack in Wes Anderson's 2007 film The Darjeeling Limited and in Jennifer Saunders's 2016 film Absolutely Fabulous: The Movie. It also features prominently in the 2024 miniseries Lost Boys and Fairies where it appears in its original form (in the background and as part of a car sing-along) as well as in a solo performance by Siôn Daniel Young in his portrayal of Gabriel.

== Sequel ==
In 1997 Sarstedt recorded a sequel, "The Last of the Breed (Lovely 2)," on his CD England's Lane. This picks up the story of Marie Claire 20 years on, living now in London. It names more people and places, including Belgravia, Ballets Russes, Cape Town, Claridge's, Gstaad, John Galliano, Harrods, Jerusalem, Long Island, Milan, Rudolf Nureyev, Palm Beach, Rio de Janeiro, and Isabella Rossellini. In later years, Sarstedt and a co-writer were working on a further sequel, "Farewell Marie-Claire," in which the story was brought to a conclusion. The song was to feature the same waltz feel as the original. But Sarstedt's retirement from the music industry meant that the track was abandoned.

== Chart history and performance ==
It was a number-one hit in the UK Singles Chart for four weeks in 1969, and was awarded the 1970 Ivor Novello Award for Best Song Musically and Lyrically. In the United States, the record reached No. 61 on the Cash Box Top 100 Singles. The single also peaked at No. 70 on the Billboard Hot 100 that May. The song re-appeared on the Canadian AC charts in 1973, peaking at number one for two weeks in March and April.

=== Weekly charts ===
Chart (1969)	Peak position
Australia (Kent Music Report)	1
Canada RPM Adult Contemporary	36
Canada RPM Top Singles	44
Ireland (IRMA)	1
New Zealand (Listener)	1
South Africa (Springbok)	1
UK	1
U.S. Billboard Hot 100	70
U.S. Billboard Easy Listening	29
U.S. Cash Box Top 100	61

=== Year-end charts ===
Chart (1969)	Rank
Australia	10
UK	5

== Certifications ==
Region	Certification	Certified units/sales
United Kingdom (BPI)	Silver	200,000^{‡}
^{‡} Sales+streaming figures based on certification alone.
