= Well I Ask You =

Single by Eden Kane
- B-side: "Before I Lose My Mind"
- Released: 1961
- Recorded: 1961
- Genre: Pop
- Length: 2:18
- Label: Decca Records - F 11353
- Songwriter: Les Vandyke
- Producer: Bunny Lewis

Eden Kane singles chronology
"Hot Chocolate Crazy" (1960)	"Well I Ask You" (1961)	"Get Lost" (1961)

"Well I Ask You" is a song written by Les Vandyke and successfully recorded in 1961 by English singer Eden Kane.

== Song information ==
Recorded in 1961, by Richard Graham Sarstedt, under stage name Eden Kane, as the follow-up to his debut single, "Hot Chocolate Crazy" (1960), "Well I Ask You" was also issued as a single in the UK and reached number one in the UK Singles Chart in August 1961. Written by Les Vandyke, arranged by John Keating, and produced by Bunny Lewis, it spent one week at the UK chart pinnacle.

The song also reached no. 1 on the New Zealand Lever Hit Parade.

The B-side of the record, released by Decca was "Before I Lose My Mind", also penned by Vandyke.

Kay Starr also recorded the song as "Well I Ask Ya" for Capitol Records in 1961.

== See also ==
- List of number-one singles from the 1960s (UK)
- UK No.1 Hits of 1961
