= Eden Kane =

English singer, record producer and actor (born 1940)

- Born: Richard Graham Sarstedt; 29 March 1940 (age 86); New Delhi, British India
- Origin: Croydon, London, England
- Genres: Pop; rock
- Occupations: Singer; instrumentalist; record producer; actor
- Instruments: Vocals; guitar
- Years active: 1959–present
- Labels: Pye Records; Decca; Fontana; Bell; Festival
- Website: edenkane.com

Richard Graham Sarstedt (born 29 March 1940), (Note: Some sources, including his own website, give 1942 as his birth year; but official sources give 1940.) known by the stage name Eden Kane, is an English pop/rock singer, musician, record producer and actor best known as a teen idol in the early 1960s, in the pre-Beatles era. He has also recorded under his birth name and with backing group the Downbeats.

Born in British India, he is the elder brother of singer-songwriter Peter Sarstedt and singer Clive Sarstedt, with whom he collaborated on numerous "Sarstedt Brothers" albums. He had success in the early 1960s as a teen idol pop star, in the pre-Beatles era with hits including the co-written "Well I Ask You" which was a UK No. 1 hit in 1961, he then spent time in Australia before moving to the United States, where he began an acting career.

== Early life and career ==
He was born in New Delhi, British India, where his parents Albert James and Coral (nee Byrne) were civil servant and classical musicians. When Richard was a child, the family—including his two younger brothers Peter and Clive, and their three sisters—moved to Kurseong, near Darjeeling, to run a tea plantation. He pursued his schooling from Sherwood College till March 1954, when, after his father's death, he moved with his brothers, sisters and mother to the UK. They settled in Norbury, Croydon, where Richard attended Heath Clark Grammar School. Inspired by Bill Haley, he learned guitar and formed a skiffle group, the Fabulous 5, which included his younger brothers.

He entered a talent contest at the Classic Cinema in Kings Road, Chelsea, where he won a contract to sing an advertising jingle for Cadbury's Drinking Chocolate, which was played frequently on Radio Luxembourg. He was signed by management team Philip Waddilove and Michael Barclay, who changed Sarstedt's name to Eden Kane – "Eden" because of its biblical associations at a time when Adam Faith was a top pop star, and "Kane" because Citizen Kane was Barclay's favourite film – and the song was released as the B-side of a single, "You Make Love So Well", by Pye Records in August 1960.

== Recording career ==
He then won a recording contract with Decca Records. His first recording for the label, "Well I Ask You"—written by Les Vandyke, arranged by John Keating, and produced by Bunny Lewis—reached No. 1 on the UK Singles Chart in August 1961. It was followed by three more top ten hits in the UK over the next year, "Get Lost" (No. 10), "Forget Me Not" (No. 3) and "I Don't Know Why" (No. 7). Together with a backing band, the Downbeats, which comprised Roger Retting, Ben Steed, Roger St. Clair and Bugs Waddell, he toured widely around the UK with stars such as Cliff Richard, Billy Fury, Marty Wilde and Helen Shapiro. His brother Peter was the band's road manager, later joining on bass, with brother Clive joining on guitar.

His fifth single for Decca, "House to Let", failed to chart, and later releases for the label were equally unsuccessful. He left Decca and joined Philips subsidiary Fontana in 1963. Some momentum was lost when his next release, originally titled "Do You Love Me" (c/w "Comeback"), had to be reissued with a new title, "Like I Love You", to avoid confusion with the UK hit covers of the Contours' US hit of the same name by Brian Poole & the Tremeloes and the Dave Clark Five. Kane's third single for Fontana, "Boys Cry" (No. 8), returned him to the charts in January 1964, but it was to be his last hit.

== TV appearances and touring ==
He made several television appearances on shows with then newly-successful groups the Beatles and the Rolling Stones, and toured Australia with Roy Orbison, Del Shannon and the Searchers. Success in Australia led to him host a TV series in there.

== Record producer ==
After his chart success in Britain dried up, Kane moved to live in California, working as a record producer. His brothers, Peter and Clive, both achieved chart success in the UK (the former in the late 1960s and the latter, billed as "Robin" Sarstedt, in the 1970s), and, in 1972, the three brothers recorded an album as the Sarstedt Brothers, Worlds Apart Together. On 20 June 1973, the brothers made their first joint appearance as a group, at Fairfield Halls in Croydon. Eden, Peter and Robin went on to win a joint BASCA Award for composing and songwriting.

Kane has since recorded for Bell, Monarch, His Master's Voice and Festival (the last two being Australian releases). He has also occasionally joined "oldies" tours in the UK with artists including Marty Wilde, John Leyton and Brian Hyland. He was a contract actor on the Star Trek team, and made several appearances in the TV series Star Trek: The Next Generation, Star Trek: Deep Space Nine and Star Trek: Voyager.

In 2017, Kane took part in a UK tour with the "Solid Gold Rock and Roll Show", which also featured Marty Wilde, Mark Wynter and Mike Berry.

A CD, entitled Y2Kane, was made available on his website.

== Personal life ==
Kane met the American journalist Charlene Groman, sister of Stefanie Powers, in Los Angeles and they married several years later. He lives in Los Angeles with his wife and their family.

== Discography ==
=== Albums ===
==== Studio albums ====
- Eden Kane (Ace of Clubs, 1962)
- It's Eden (Fontana, 1964)
- Another Day Passes By (Evolution, 1971) (as Richard Sarstedt)
- Y2Kane (Eden Kane CD, 1999)
- Eden Rock (Eden Kane CD, 2001)
- Signs of Love (2012)
- Fifty Three (2014)

==== Compilation albums ====
- Well I Ask You (Deram, 1995)
- All the Hits Plus More...The Best of Eden Kane (Prestige, 1996)
- Very Best Of (Pegasus, 1997)
- Boys Cry (Pegasus, 2004)
- Well I Ask You – The Complete 60s Recordings (RPM, 2017)

=== Singles ===
Year	Title	Peak chart positions				Label
Year	Title	UK	AUS	IRE	US	Label
1960	"You Make Love So Well" b/w "Hot Chocolate Crazy"	—	—	—	—	Pye
1961	"Well I Ask You" b/w "Before I Lose My Mind"	1	15	1	119	Decca
1961	"Get Lost" b/w "I'm Telling You"	10	85	4	—	Decca
1962	"Forget Me Not" b/w "A New Kind of Lovin'"	3	70	6	—	Decca
1962	"I Don't Know Why" b/w "Music for Strings"	7	—	—	—	Decca
1962	"House to Let" b/w "I Told You"	—	—	—	—	Decca
1963	"Sounds Funny to Me" b/w "Someone Wants to Know"	—	—	—	—	Decca
1963	"Nimm das Mädchen" (Germany-only release) b/w "Meine große Liebe (Wind und Wellen)"	—	—	—	—	Decca
1963	"Tomorrow Night" b/w "I Won't Believe Them"	—	—	—	—	Fontana
1964	"Boys Cry" b/w "Don't Come Crying to Me"	8	22	6	—	Fontana
1964	"Rain, Rain, Go Away" b/w "Guess Who It Is?"	—	—	—	—	Fontana
1964	"Hangin' Around" b/w "Gonna Do Something About You"	—	—	—	—	Fontana
1965	"If You Want This Love" b/w "Have I Done Something Wrong?"	—	—	—	—	Fontana
1966	"Magic Town" b/w "The Whole World Was Crying"	—	—	—	—	Decca
1967	"Gotta Get Through to You" (Australia and New Zealand-only release) b/w "A Million Ants"	—	—	—	—	His Master's Voice
1967	"My Whole World Is Tumbling Down" (Australia and New Zealand-only release) b/w "In the Day of My Youth"	—	—	—	—	His Master's Voice/Impact
1968	"Time, Love, Hope, Life" (Australia and New Zealand-only release) b/w "It Doesn't Matter Anymore"	—	—	—	—	Festival
1970	"Reason to Believe" b/w "I Played It Like a Fool"	—	—	—	—	Bell
1971	"Another Day (Passes By)" (as Richard Sarstedt; US and Germany-only release) b/w "Charlie"	—	—	—	—	Evolution/Philips
"—" denotes releases that did not chart or were not released

== See also ==
- List of artists under the Decca Records label
- List of artists who reached number one on the UK Singles Chart
- List of performers on Top of the Pops
