= Japan (band) =

English new wave band

- Japan in summer 1981: Sylvian, Jansen, Karn, Barbieri

Background information
- Also known as: Rain Tree Crow (1989–1991)
- Origin: Catford, South London, England
- Genres: New wave; art pop; glam rock; synth-pop
- Years active: 1974–1982, 1989–1991
- Labels: Hansa; Virgin
- Past members: David Sylvian; Mick Karn; Steve Jansen; Richard Barbieri; Rob Dean

Japan were an English new wave band formed in 1974 in Catford, South London by David Sylvian (vocals, guitar, keyboards), Steve Jansen (drums) and Mick Karn (bass guitar), joined the following year by Richard Barbieri (keyboards) and Rob Dean (lead guitar). Initially a glam rock-inspired band, Japan developed their sound and androgynous look to incorporate art rock, electronic music and foreign influences.

Japan achieved success in the late 1970s and early 1980s, releasing nine UK top 40 hits, including the 1982 top 5 hit single "Ghosts", and scoring a UK top 5 with the live album Oil on Canvas (1983). Six of the band's albums have achieved Gold status in the UK. The band split in December 1982, just as they were beginning to experience commercial success in the UK and abroad. Its members went on to pursue other musical projects, though they reformed briefly in the early 1990s under the name Rain Tree Crow, releasing an album of that name 1991.

== History ==
The band began as a group of friends in the early 1970s. Brothers (birth surname Batt) David Sylvian (guitar and vocals) and Steve Jansen (drums), and bassist Mick Karn studied at the same school, Catford Boys', Brownhill Road, South London. As youngsters they played Sylvian's two-chord numbers mainly as a means of escape; initially with Karn on lead vocals and Sylvian on guitar and backing vocals, Sylvian became lead vocalist in 1974. In June 1974, they made their first public performance at Karn's brother's wedding reception.

The band was initially nameless until the members opted to call themselves Japan. This name was intended by Sylvian to be temporary until they could think of something else, but ultimately became permanent. The following year they were joined by another school friend Richard Barbieri on keyboards and later by lead guitarist Rob Dean, and signed a management deal with Simon Napier-Bell (who also managed the Yardbirds, Marc Bolan, London and Wham!) in 1976. After coming runner up to the Cure in a talent contest staged by Hansa Records the band signed a recording contract with Hansa-Ariola in 1977, becoming an alternative glam rock outfit in the mould of Lou Reed, David Bowie, T. Rex, Roxy Music, and New York Dolls, although their initial material was guitar-based funk.

Shortly after signing the record deal Sylvian, Jansen and Karn adopted their stage names. Initially, the record company was horrified by the apparent similarity of Sylvian's and Jansen's names to the names of band members of the New York Dolls, but eventually accepted the name changes. In 1977, the band embarked on their first recording session for the record company with producer Ray Singer and performed as support band for Jim Capaldi and the Contenders on a UK tour.

=== Early years ===
In March 1978, the band released their first single, a cover version of "Don't Rain on My Parade" followed a month later by their debut album Adolescent Sex. Advertising campaigns that focused on the band's androgynous glam rock image failed to attract much interest for the band in the UK but was more successful in Japan where the band attracted a considerable fan following before a record had been released.

The debut album was followed by a UK tour supporting Blue Öyster Cult, intended to promote their album. The album itself sold poorly, and Japan faced negative criticism and hostile audiences. In August 1978 their second single, "The Unconventional," failed to chart. In November the band made a short US tour, but although they were better accepted by American audiences it proved to be their only US tour. The follow-up album Obscure Alternatives showed musical progress and particularly the last track "The Tenant" – which has been described as a fusion of Low-era David Bowie and the piano works of Erik Satie – was a hint of the band's future, but again the album was a commercial and critical flop.

Influenced by artists such as Lou Reed, T. Rex, New York Dolls, Roxy Music and David Bowie, both albums failed to garner public attention in the UK and did not chart, being widely dismissed by the UK music press as being distinctly outmoded at a time when punk and new wave bands were in ascendance. However, both albums, produced by Ray Singer, sold well in the Netherlands, where the single version of "Adolescent Sex" was a top 30 hit. They also gained some popularity in Canada.

The band's greatest popularity was enjoyed in Japan. They were voted the second most popular group in Japan in 1978, and was on top of the list the following year. In March 1979, they made their first visit to the country and sold out the 11,000 seat capacity Budokan Theatre three days in a row.

=== Mid-career ===
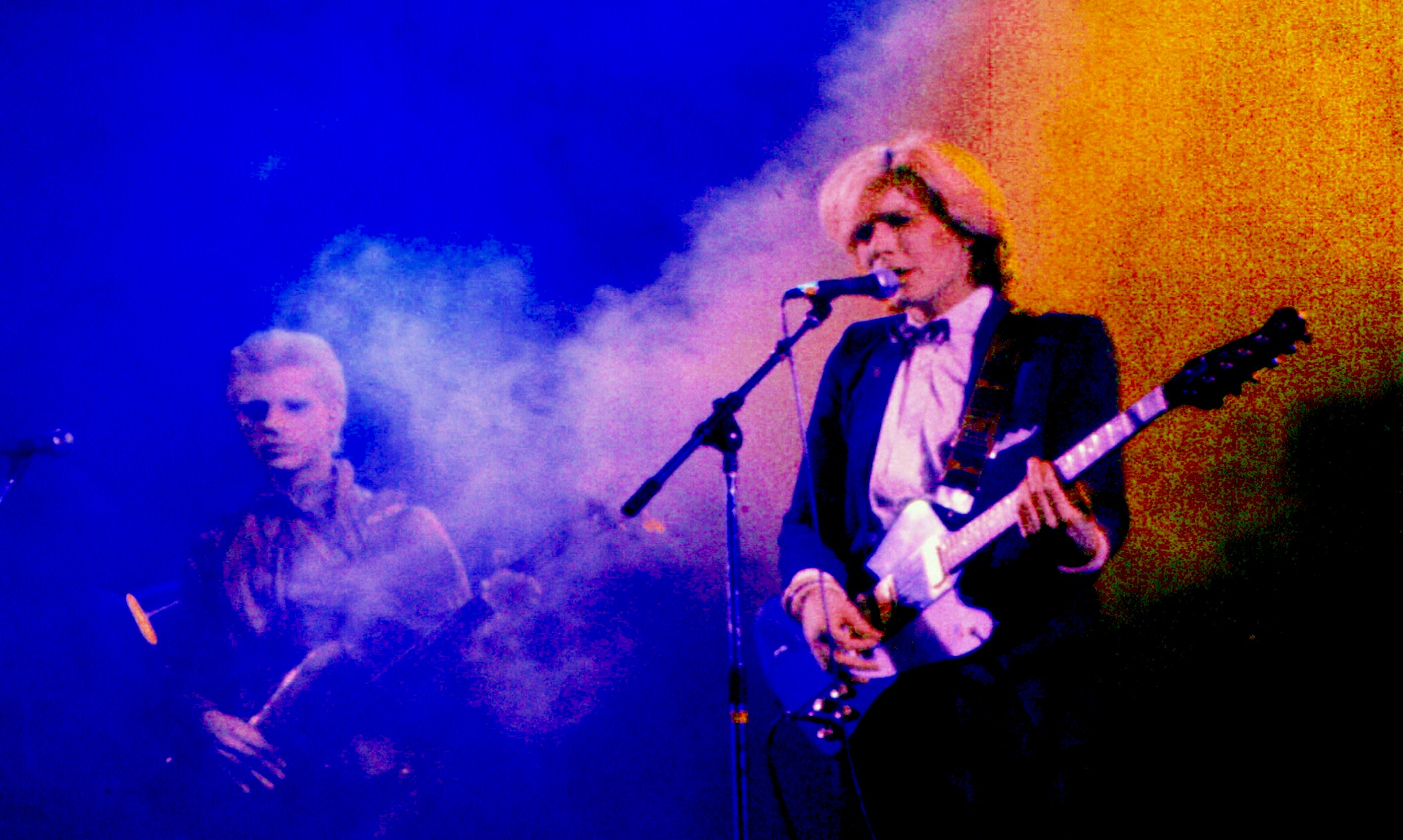
Japan perform in 1979 (Karn, left, and Sylvian).

In 1979, the band briefly worked with the successful Euro disco producer Giorgio Moroder, who co-wrote and produced a one-off single, "Life in Tokyo". The track was unsuccessful as a single but a significant change in musical style from their earlier guitar-laden recordings, moving them away from their glam rock roots and into electronic new wave.

The electronic style continued on their third album, Quiet Life (1979), which was produced by the band with John Punter and Simon Napier-Bell. In a retrospective review of the band's work, The Quietus described Quiet Life as defining "a very European form of detached, sexually-ambiguous and thoughtful art-pop, one not too dissimilar to what the ever-prescient David Bowie had delivered two years earlier with Low". It showcased Barbieri's synthesizers, Sylvian's now baritone style of singing, Karn's distinctive fretless bass sound and Jansen's odd-timbred and intricate percussion work, with Dean's guitar playing becoming somewhat sparser and atmospheric. While largely ignored in their home country, Quiet Life was a success in Japan, where it had the distinction of becoming the first foreign rock record to enter the national chart, and went straight in at number 8 in Canada, and also had some success in continental Europe.

In the UK, Quiet Life was the first Japan album to reach the UK Albums Chart, but it wasn't a success on its initial release. It peaked at a lowly 72 in February 1980 and dropped out of the chart the following week. The band had for long been a financial strain on their record company and management, and after a final attempt to score a hit single that would boost the sales of the album with a cover version of "I Second That Emotion" was unsuccessful, Japan was dropped by Hansa Records.

Hansa-Ariola would later issue a compilation album (Assemblage) featuring highlights from the band's tenure on the label, followed by a series of remixed and re-released singles.

=== Final years ===
After leaving Hansa-Ariola, the band signed with Virgin Records who released their last studio albums, Gentlemen Take Polaroids (1980) and Tin Drum (1981). The albums continued to expand their audience as the band refined its new sound, although the combination of their newer sound and the band's stylised visual appearance led to them unintentionally becoming associated with the early-1980s New Romantic scene. The band had always worn make-up since their inception in the mid-1970s at the tail end of the glam rock era, several years before the New Romantic movement had begun. In an October 1981 interview, Sylvian commented "There's a period going past at the moment that may make us look as though we're in fashion." In another interview, he stated "I don't like to be associated with them [New Romantics]. The attitudes are so very different." Of Japan's fashion sense, Sylvian said "For them [New Romantics], fancy dress is a costume. But ours is a way of life. We look and dress this way every day." Regardless, it had a positive effect on the band's record sales in the UK and they slowly began to gain chart success.

After a couple of lower charting singles, their first UK top 40 hit was a re-release of the "Quiet Life" single, which peaked at No. 19 in October 1981. Three of the singles from the Tin Drum album also peaked in the UK top 40, with its unconventional single "Ghosts" reaching No. 5, becoming Japan's biggest domestic hit. The Tin Drum album itself peaked just outside the UK top 10, and was the band's first record to be certified by the BPI, being awarded a silver disc within a month of release, and reaching gold status within four months. The album, produced by Steve Nye, is often regarded as one of the most innovative of the 1980s, with its fusion of occidental and oriental sounds. In 2011, thirty years after its release, Tin Drum was awarded BBC Radio 6 Music's 'Goldie Award' posthumously for the Best Album of 1981.

With personality conflicts leading to rising tensions within the band, Tin Drum was to be the band's final studio album. Long-simmering differences among the band members came to a head when Karn's girlfriend, photographer Yuka Fujii, moved in with Sylvian and the individual members proceeded with their own projects. Rob Dean had already departed (in May 1981) after the release of the Gentlemen Take Polaroids album, as his electric guitar work became superfluous for the band's sound on Tin Drum. Dean subsequently formed the band Illustrated Man. Karn released his first solo album, Titles, at the same time the band announced their split in late 1982.

The final "Sons of Pioneers" tour in late 1982 included dates in Europe, UK and the Far East. On this tour, guitarist and keyboardist Masami Tsuchiya performed with the band on stage.

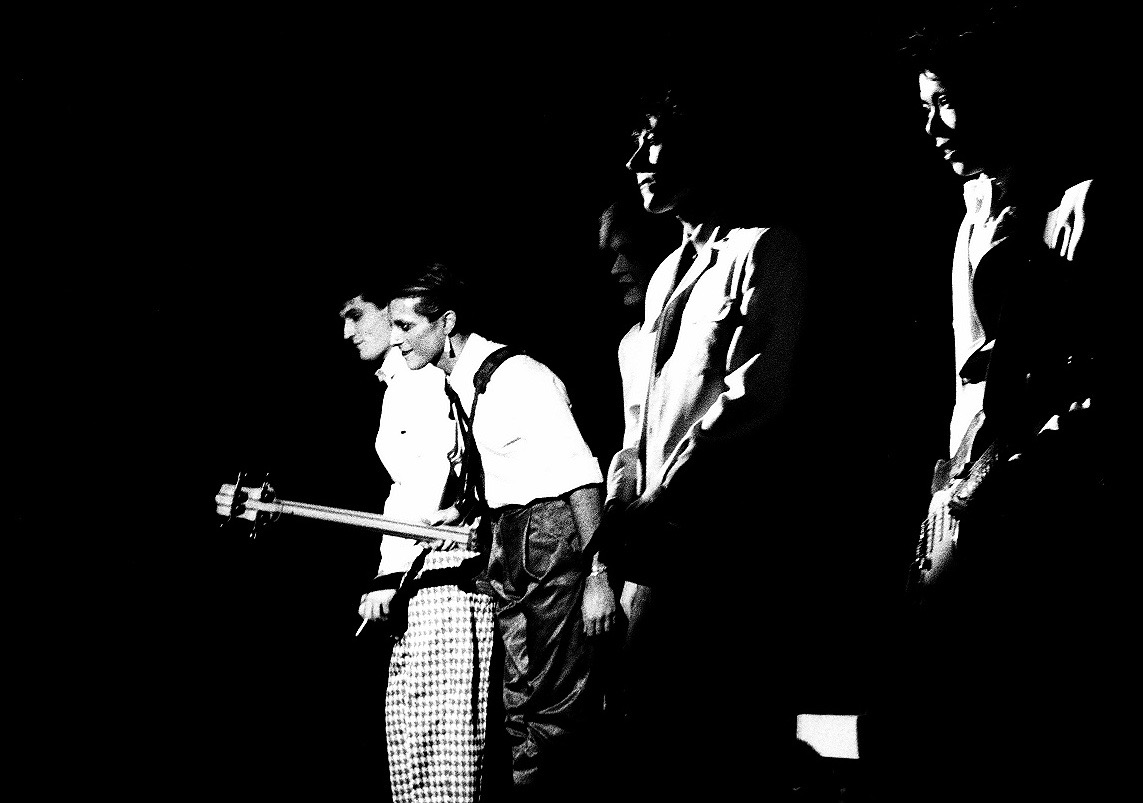
Japan in November 1982

The group's final UK performances included a final TV appearance playing together on The Old Grey Whistle Test in October and culminating in a six-night sell-out stint at London's Hammersmith Odeon in November (which would be recorded and filmed to produce Oil on Canvas, a live album and video released in June 1983). Japan's last performance was on 16 December 1982 in Nagoya, Japan.

The band decided to split just as they were beginning to achieve major commercial success both in the UK and internationally, with Oil on Canvas becoming their highest charting UK album, reaching No. 5 on the UK Albums Chart, a rare feat for a live album. By this time, the band's back catalogue had begun to sell steadily and both Hansa-Ariola and Virgin Records continued to release Japan singles into 1983, ultimately earning the band a total of nine top 40 hits in the UK. In summer 1982, a Hansa re-release of "I Second That Emotion" became Japan's second top 10 hit, reaching number 9. A remixed version of "Life in Tokyo" and a Virgin Records release of "Nightporter" were subsequently both top 30 hits on the UK Singles Chart.

=== Collaborations ===
During the early 1980s, Japanese multi-instrumentalist and experimental keyboardist Ryuichi Sakamoto, of Yellow Magic Orchestra (YMO), briefly collaborated with the band, and worked directly alongside Sylvian on tracks such as "Taking Islands in Africa". He would continue to work with Sylvian both before and after the band split, and the pair would achieve the hit singles "Bamboo Houses" (1982) and "Forbidden Colours" (1983). Similarly, Steve Jansen was influenced by YMO's drummer Yukihiro Takahashi, subsequently joining him on several of Takahashi's solo projects and tours of Japan, along with additional full collaborative works between the two.

=== Post break-up ===
All of the band members went on to work on other projects, with varying degrees of success. After his collaborations with Sakamoto, Sylvian's first solo album Brilliant Trees reached No. 4 on the UK Albums Chart in 1984, spawning the UK top 20 single "Red Guitar". Meanwhile, Karn had already become a sought-after session musician and worked with artists such as Gary Numan, Kate Bush, and Joan Armatrading. He also had a top 40 hit ("After a Fashion") with Midge Ure in 1983, and collaborated with Peter Murphy of Bauhaus as the duo Dalis Car, releasing an album in 1984. Jansen and Barbieri worked together as the Dolphin Brothers and simply as Jansen & Barbieri ("Stories Across Borders", 1991, Virgin), and Rob Dean went on to work with Gary Numan and Sinéad O'Connor and also later played guitars in Australian band Geisha from late 1987 to April 1988.

==== Rain Tree Crow ====
In September 1989, Sylvian, Karn, Jansen and Barbieri reunited under the moniker 'Rain Tree Crow'. They released an eponymously titled album in April 1991, which was well received by music critics and reached the UK top 25. However, once again, the band dissolved following creative frictions between Sylvian and the other members.

==== Other projects ====
Medium Productions was a record label created in 1993 primarily to publish the music of Steve Jansen, Richard Barbieri, and Mick Karn. Medium was a means to release their own music with other collaborating artists, without 'major record label' compromise. Fifteen CDs of largely instrumental music were produced over a ten-year period. Medium Productions folded in 2004 as the founders became more involved in other projects (such as Porcupine Tree, Nine Horses). The entire MP catalogue has been re-released on the Voiceprint Music label beginning in 2001.

Richard Barbieri moved on to become the keyboardist for progressive rock band Porcupine Tree, a role he has filled since 1995's The Sky Moves Sideways. Although band members would work with each other again on various individual projects (including Sylvian and Jansen's Nine Horses project), no further full Japan reunions were planned in any form.

Throughout the 1990s Karn, Jansen and Barbieri reunited in instrumental projects with different guitarists such as David Torn and Steven Wilson.

Mick Karn died from cancer in January 2011, twenty years after the band's reunion as Rain Tree Crow.

== Band members ==
- David Sylvian – vocals, guitars, keyboards (1974–1982, 1989–1990)
- Mick Karn – bass guitars, saxophone, oboe, flute, recorder, clarinet, backing vocals (1974–1982, 1989–1990; died 2011)
- Steve Jansen – drums, backing vocals, keyboards, percussion (1974–1982, 1989–1990)
- Richard Barbieri – keyboards, synthesisers, occasional backing vocals (1975–1982, 1989–1990)
- Rob Dean – guitars, backing vocals (1975–1981)

Live personnel

- Jane Shorter – saxophone (1979–1980)
- David Rhodes – guitars (1981)
- Masami Tsuchiya – guitars, keyboards (1982)

Timeline

== Discography ==
- Adolescent Sex (1978)
- Obscure Alternatives (1978)
- Quiet Life (1979)
- Gentlemen Take Polaroids (1980)
- Tin Drum (1981)
- Rain Tree Crow same line-up as Japan (1991)

=== Remasters ===
In 2003, Virgin Records re-issued remastered editions of Gentlemen Take Polaroids, Tin Drum and Oil on Canvas. BMG followed suit next year, and re-issued Adolescent Sex, Obscure Alternatives, Quiet Life, and Assemblage. All of these re-releases came in the 'digipak' format, collecting many bonus tracks. In 2006, all were repackaged in jewel cases to allow sale at a lower price point.

The Tin Drum digipak re-issue was of particular interest as it was packaged in a cardboard box and contained the bonus 5-inch single "The Art of Parties", which comprised "The Art of Parties" (12" single and live versions), "Ghosts" (single version) and "Life Without Buildings" (B-side to "The Art of Parties" single). The package also included a booklet with black-and-white photos of the band members.

Half-speed mastered 45 rpm double vinyl LP editions of Gentlemen Take Polaroids and Tin Drum were issued in August 2018. Both albums were remastered at Abbey Road Studios by Miles Showell. A single disc 33 RPM edition of both albums was also made available. The albums entered the Official Vinyl Charts at numbers 2 and 3 respectively in the first week of sales.

In March 2021, the Quiet Life album was reissued by BMG in several deluxe formats, including a boxset (featuring three CDs with a 180g half-speed mastered vinyl), a couple of separate vinyl editions, and a CD release. The release returned Japan to the UK Top 20 for the first time since 1983, peaking at no.13 on the UK Album Chart and no.2 on the UK Vinyl chart.

== Tours ==
- October 1977: UK Tour supporting Jim Capaldi and the Contenders
- April–June 1978: UK Tour supporting Blue Öyster Cult
- November 1978: US Tour (Los Angeles, San Francisco, Chicago, New York (2 dates), Boston)
- November–December 1978: Obscure Alternatives UK Tour (Several dates cancelled due to illness in the band)
- March 1979: Japanese Tour (6 dates)
- March–April 1979: European/UK Tour (Germany, Holland, Belgium, UK)
- January–March 1980: Quiet Life Tour UK/Japan, with Jane Shorter on saxophone
- February 1981: Japanese Tour (7 dates)
- April–May 1981: The Art of Parties UK Tour (last tour with Rob Dean)
- December 1981: Visions of China UK Tour, with David Rhodes on guitar
- October–December 1982: Sons of Pioneers Tour (Sweden, Germany, The Netherlands, Belgium, France, UK, Thailand, Hong Kong, Japan), with Masami Tsuchiya on guitar and keyboards. November concerts at Hammersmith Odeon recorded for the Oil on Canvas album and video.
