= My Resistance Is Low =

Song by Hoagy Carmichael with the Gordon Jenkins Chorus and Orchestra
- Songwriter(s): H. Carmichael, Harold Adamson

"My Resistance Is Low" is a 1951 song by American singer, songwriter and band leader Hoagy Carmichael, with later lyrics by Harold Adamson.

== Creation ==
Carmichael had the melody, and then recorded it backed by the Gordon Jenkins Chorus and Orchestra. Released on March 15, 1951, it did not feature in the Billboard chart.

== The Las Vegas Story ==
The song is probably best known to American audiences for being in the closing sequence to the 1952 Jane Russell movie The Las Vegas Story, which was produced and directed by Howard Hughes. Hughes cast Carmichael as Happy the piano player in a bar, and Carmichael agreed that Hughes could commission Harold Adamson to write suitable lyrics.

In its film review, Time Out magazine commented:

A minor RKO gem showing all the preferences of its then owner Howard Hughes (aeroplanes, brunettes, breasts and disenchanted heroes).... It all finishes with a perfunctory nod toward family values (by marrying off an irrelevant young couple), but the film wears its intentions on its sleeve with the final shot: Hoagy looks first at the seductive Russell, then winks at us as he sings, My Resistance Is Low

Re-released as a result, this time with the Adamson lyrics sung by Carmichael, released through Decca Records hit number one in the United Kingdom and a number of other countries.

== Later releases ==
The song became a perennial classic in the UK, with most releases since Carmichael's within that country. The best known is 1976's (Clive) Robin Sarstedt's, who became a one-hit wonder when the track reached number 3 in the UK Singles Chart.

Artist	Date	Notes
The Shadows	September 1961	Album track on instrumental album "The Shadows"
Buddy Britten & The Regents	September 1963	Single A-side, Oriole CB 1859
Robin Sarstedt	1976	Number 3 in the UK
Bing Crosby	1977	for his album Beautiful Memories
Georgie Fame & Annie Ross	1981	
Elvis Costello & Paul Riley & Pete Thomas	November 14, 1994	
John Eaton	1994	
