= Clive Sarstedt =

British pop music singer (1944–2022)

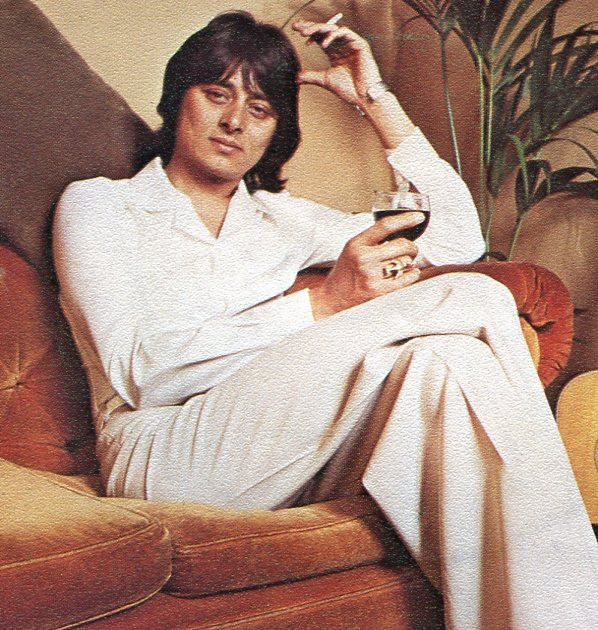
- Sarstedt in 1976

Background information
- Also known as: Wes Sands; Robin Sarstedt
- Born: Clive Robin Sarstedt; 21 January 1944; Ajmer, Ajmer-Merwara Province, British India
- Origin: Croydon, London, England
- Died: 22 January 2022 (aged 78)
- Genres: Pop
- Occupations: Singer; musician
- Instruments: Vocals; guitar
- Years active: 1959–2022
- Label: RCA Victor

Clive Robin Sarstedt (21 January 1944 – 22 January 2022), who also recorded as Clive Sands, Wes Sands, and Robin Sarstedt, was a British pop singer and instrumentalist active from the late 1950s. He was best known for his 1976 UK hit "My Resistance Is Low", a version of a song written and originally recorded by Hoagy Carmichael. He was the younger brother of singers Eden Kane and Peter Sarstedt.

== Early life ==
Sarstedt was born in Ajmer, British India, now in Rajasthan, to parents who were British civil servants working there during the Second World War. Both had trained as classical musicians. After Indian independence from Britain in 1947, they remained in India and managed a tea plantation, and their sons went to school there. In 1954, Sarstedt's father died, and the family moved to Britain, settling in south London.

Sarstedt was the youngest brother of Peter Sarstedt and Eden Kane and with them formed a skiffle group, the Fabulous Five.

== Career ==
Sarstedt appeared on many live music shows including Top of The Pops. He initially recorded under the names "Wes Sands" (recorded by his manager, Joe Meek) and "Clive Sands". He joined The Deejays in Sweden in 1966 and 1967. They had two big hits on "Tio i Topp" in Sweden: "Dum Dum (Marble Breaks And Iron Bends)" and "Baby Talk". He finally had a hit in 1976, with a cover version of the Hoagy Carmichael penned song, "My Resistance Is Low", using his middle name and billed as Robin Sarstedt. It reached Number 3 in the UK Singles Chart.

Without other chart success, he remained a British one-hit wonder. However, in the Benelux countries he hit the charts later in 1976 with his version of "Let's Fall in Love", a song written by Harold Arlen and Ted Koehler and published in 1933, thus prolonging his short chart career there.

== Later life and death ==
From the late 1990s Sarstedt lived in the Almería area of Spain.

Sarstedt died from a heart attack on 22 January 2022, at the age of 78.

== Album discography ==
- Clive Sarstedt – 1970 – RCA Records
- Freeway Getaway – 1971 – RCA
- In a Dream – 1971 – RCA

== See also ==
- List of performers on Top of the Pops
- One-hit wonders in the UK
