= Don't Rain on My Parade =

Song by Barbra Streisand

from the album Funny Girl
- Released: 1964
- Recorded: December 20, 1963
- Studio: Manhattan Center (New York)
- Genre: Pop; show tune
- Length: 2:46
- Composer: Jule Styne
- Lyricist: Bob Merrill

"Don't Rain on My Parade" is a song from the 1964 musical Funny Girl, further popularized by the show's 1968 film adaptation. Written by Bob Merrill and Jule Styne, the song was first performed by Barbra Streisand on both stage and screen. The song ranked 46 in AFI's 100 Years...100 Songs survey of top tunes in American cinema.

Streisand has performed the song live on many occasions, including her 1993–94 concert tour, the 1999–2000 Timeless tour, her 2006–07 tour, and in 2016 for Barbra: The Music, The Mem'ries, The Magic.

There is a reprise version of this song with alternate lyrics which served as the finale for the stage show, but was cut from the film. Streisand performed the reprise version live (for the first time since the original stage production) as an encore during her 2006–07 Tour.

== Streisand recordings ==
- "Don't Rain on My Parade" from Funny Girl: Original Broadway Cast Recording (1964) – 2:46
- "Don't Rain on My Parade (reprise)" from Funny Girl: Original Broadway Cast Recording (1964) – 2:07
- "Don't Rain on My Parade" from Funny Girl: Original Soundtrack Recording (1968) – 2:45
- "Don't Rain on My Parade" (live) from Live Concert at the Forum (1972) – 2:39
- "Don't Rain on My Parade" (live) from Barbra Streisand...and Other Musical Instruments (1973) – 2:38
- "I'm Still Here/Everybody Says Don't/Don't Rain on My Parade" (live) from Barbra: The Concert (1994) and the abridged Concert: Highlights (1995) – 4:26
- "I'm the Greatest Star/Second Hand Rose/Don't Rain on My Parade" (live) from Timeless: Live in Concert (2000) – 5:25
- "Don't Rain on My Parade (live)" from Live in Concert 2006 (Target exclusive edition) (2007) – 2:57
- "Don't Rain on My Parade (reprise)" from Live in Concert 2006 (2007) – 3:31

== Other versions ==
The song has been recorded by many artists, including Nancy Wilson in 1964, Bobby Darin in 1966, Shirley Bassey in 1965, and Japan on their 1978 album Adolescent Sex, Judy Garland, Liza Minnelli, Diana Ross, and Donna Summer have also sung this song live.

=== Recordings and live versions ===
- The song was covered by Diana Ross and the Supremes on their 1968 album Sing and Perform Funny Girl.
- Bea Arthur performed the song for the 1977 Tony Awards.
- British new wave band Japan covered the song on their 1978 debut album Adolescent Sex and released it as their debut single the same year.
- Lillias White performed it for a 2002 Actors’ Fund benefit.
- Mireille Mathieu sang the song on her 2006 album.
- The choir group Only Men Aloud! recorded the song for their eponymous 2008 album.
- International champion barbershop quartet Max Q covered it on their 2009 album, Journey.
- Michele also performed the song at the 2010 Tony Awards.
- On April 2, 2018, Joey McIntyre performed a live cover of the song for the Broadway Backwards benefit at the Al Hirschfeld Theatre.
- In 2023, after Donald Trump's fourth indictment, comedian Randy Rainbow parodied the song as "Don't Arraign on His Parade", joking it was "from the musical 'Fani, Gurl.'"

=== In film and television ===
- Bobby Darin's version was used in the film American Beauty and the trailer for Catch Me If You Can.
- Robin Williams, dressed as Streisand, sang the song during a scene in the 1993 film Mrs. Doubtfire.
- Lois Griffin sang parts of this song in the 1999 Family Guy episode "Mind Over Murder".
- LaToya London sang the song on the third season of American Idol in 2004.
- The song was performed by Toni Collette and Nia Vardalos in the 2004 film Connie and Carla.
- In the American musical series Glee, Rachel Berry (Lea Michele) repeatedly covered the song, the first time being in "Sectionals". The song serves as her theme. Santana Lopez (Naya Rivera) covered the song in "Frenemies". The song was also released on the albums Glee: The Music, Volume 2, Glee: The Music, The Complete Season One, and Glee: The 3D Concert Movie Motion Picture Soundtrack.
- The Dorothys performed the song on Over the Rainbow as a group number.
- In 2016, Yeardley Smith sang this song as Lisa in The Simpsons episode "How Lisa Got Her Marge Back".
- In 2023, Adele and James Corden sang this song in the final Carpool Karaoke for The Late Late Show with James Corden.
