= Mick Karn =

Greek Cypriot bassist (1958–2011)

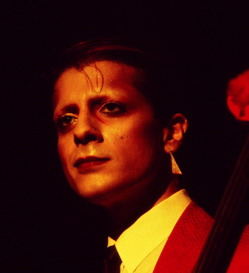
- Karn in November 1982

Background information
- Born: Andonis Michaelides; 24 July 1958; Nicosia, British Cyprus
- Died: 4 January 2011 (aged 52) London, England
- Genres: Art rock; pop; experimental rock; post-punk; new wave
- Occupation: Musician
- Instruments: Bass guitar; saxophone; flute; clarinet; dida
- Years active: 1974–2010
- Labels: Virgin; CMP; Medium Productions
- Formerly of: Japan; Dalis Car
- Website: mickkarn.net
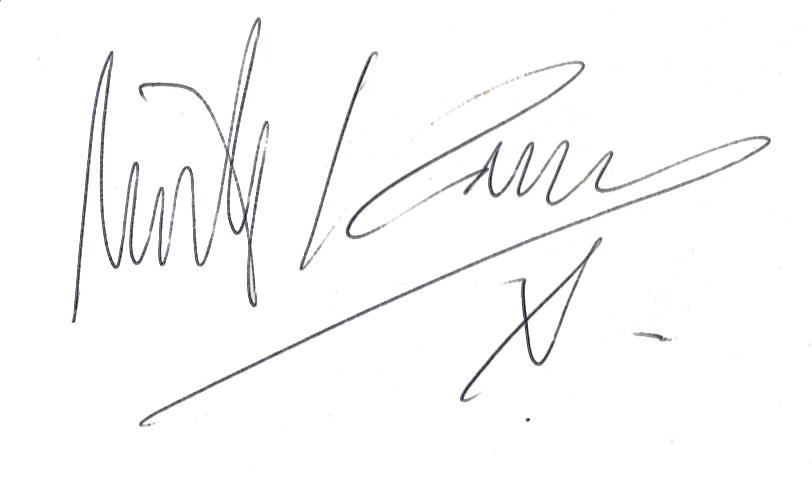
- Mick Karn's signature (c. 1980)

Andonis Michaelides (Greek: Αντώνης Μιχαηλίδης; 24 July 1958 – 4 January 2011), better known as Mick Karn, was a Greek Cypriot musician who rose to fame as the bassist for the art rock and new wave band Japan. His distinctive fretless bass guitar sound and melodic playing style were a trademark of the band's sound.

== Early life ==
Karn was born Andonis Michaelides in Nicosia on 24 July 1958. When he was three, his Greek Cypriot parents moved with him to London, where he grew up. In his youth, he began playing mouth organ at the age of seven and violin at the age of eleven, before he took up playing bassoon for the school orchestra. As a bassoon player he performed with the London Schools Symphony Orchestra in a concert in October 1972 which was broadcast by Radio 4. However, when his bassoon was stolen and his school refused to buy him a new one, he bought a bass guitar for £5 from a school friend. At school he became friends with David Sylvian and his younger brother Steve. As an escape from their south London environment, they began to play music together, and in June 1974 they made their first public performance.

== Career ==
=== Japan ===
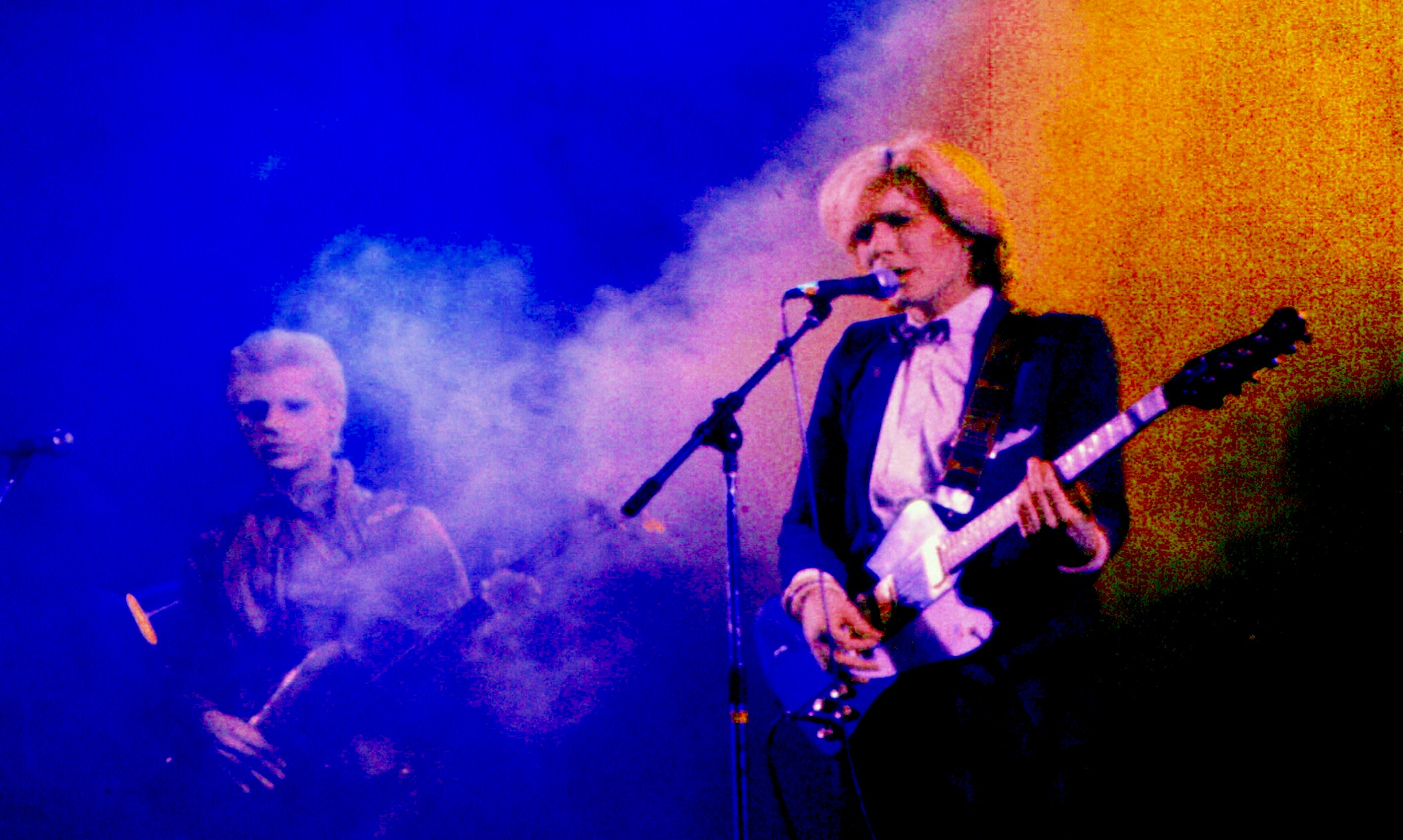
Japan in Toronto, 24 November 1979

Initially with Karn as lead vocalist, their band christened themselves Japan in 1974. Joined by keyboardist Richard Barbieri and guitarist Rob Dean the following year, they signed a recording contract with German disco label Hansa in 1977, with which they recorded three studio albums and became an alternative glam rock outfit in the mould of David Bowie, T.Rex, and The New York Dolls. They switched to Virgin Records to record their subsequent albums Gentlemen Take Polaroids and Tin Drum.

As the band started to achieve commercial success with the release of Tin Drum and specifically the single "Ghosts", which reached the top five in 1982, tensions and personality conflicts between band members arose. Tin Drum was to be the band's final studio album. Long-simmering differences among the band members came to a head when Karn's girlfriend, photographer Yuka Fujii, moved in with Sylvian, and the individual members forged ahead with their own projects. Karn said in an interview that as tensions with their record company had abated following Japan's commercial success, band members began focusing on personal differences rather than on the common enemy.

=== Session work and solo projects ===
Karn played bass guitar and saxophone on Gary Numan's 1981 No.6 hit "She's Got Claws" and other tracks on its parent No.3 hit album, Dance. In November 1982, Karn released his first solo album, Titles, just as Japan had announced their split. In 1982, Karn wrote some material with Michael Finbarr Murphy, guitarist and writer for Heatwave, Alan Murphy of Level 42, and Diana Ross, among others. They played some low-key gigs around London during the summer of 1982, and then went their separate ways. That same year, Karn appeared on The Old Grey Whistle Test along with Angie Bowie, former wife of David Bowie. In 1982 he also contributed saxophone playing on three tracks on the Swedish band Lustans Lakejer's album En plats i solen, produced by Richard Barbieri. Although Karn submitted an album's worth of demos to Virgin Records as a more pop-oriented follow-up to his debut solo album Titles, the record label declined to fund the record and it was abandoned. In 1983, he collaborated with Midge Ure on the UK top 40 single "After a Fashion", and in 1984, he formed Dalis Car with Peter Murphy. The duo released one album, The Waking Hour, in late 1984.

Karn also contributed to recordings by other artists, playing bass guitar on Bill Nelson's Chimera mini-LP on "Glow World" as well as "Heads We're Dancing" from Kate Bush's The Sensual World and with Joan Armatrading.

1987 saw Karn playing a formidable role on solo projects with David Torn and Bill Bruford, such as Torn's Cloud About Mercury. Torn hoped to hire Karn for the project, then switched to Tony Levin for the recording after Karn had a car accident.. Karn returned for the live tour, where his lyrical fretless bass work played a consequential role.

In the 1990s, he worked with artist David Torn, Andy Rinehart and a number of Japanese musicians, and formed the multinational new wave band, NiNa. Later on, he worked as a solo artist. He played at least one concert with Pete Townshend that featured an all-star line-up, including Phil Collins and Midge Ure.

Also in the 1990s, he started the Medium Productions label along with Steve Jansen and Richard Barbieri, two of his former fellow Japan members, and Debi Zornes (label management and artist co-ordination). In 2006, the MK Music imprint was established by Karn, Zornes and Mike Trenery; and beginning with 2006's Three Part Species, all releases, including an autobiography, have the MK Music logo on them.

In 2001, Karn began to work with Gota Yashiki, Vivian Hsu, Masahide Sakuma, and Masami Tsuchiya in the band The d.e.p., or doggy eels project. That same year he worked with Paul Wong on his Yellow Paul Wong release. Karn left London in 2004 to live in Cyprus with his wife and son, financially enabling himself to keep working as a musician/artist. In 2009, Karn also released his autobiography, titled Japan & Self Existence, available through his website and Lulu. This details his music career, his interest in sculpture and painting, his childhood, relationships and family.

On 30 August 2010, Peter Murphy disclosed via a video message (subsequently removed/hidden) on his personal Facebook profile that he would be reuniting with Karn for a week in London, perhaps in November, to begin writing and recording for a second Dalis Car album. Murphy also added that this would be the first time the two had seen each other since 1983. The project was cut short, however, as Karn had recently been diagnosed with cancer. After his death, five of the tracks they did record were released on 5 April 2012 as an EP titled InGladAloneness. The tracks were mixed by Steve Jansen and mastered by Pieter Snapper in Istanbul, while the artwork for the EP was created by Thomas Bak with a painting by Jarosław Kukowski.

== Musical style ==
Karn was essentially a self-taught musician, stating, "I rely very much on my ears. If it sounds as if it's the right thing, then I'll keep it—even if it may not be." His first musical instrument was bassoon, with which he attended and passed an LSSO audition. After his bassoon was stolen from him, he purchased a bass guitar for £5. It was then he joined up with David Batt (Sylvian), who played acoustic guitar.

Although Karn was principally Japan's bassist, he also played all the wind instruments, including the saxophone; on Tin Drum, he played the Chinese suona (credited as "dida") for the authentic oriental sound. Karn's use of the fretless bass guitar, a relatively unusual instrument in modern popular music, produces a distinctive sound and playing style, which makes his playing immediately recognisable.

Karn played an aluminium-neck Travis Bean bass on all Japan albums up to Gentlemen Take Polaroids. In 1981, he moved on to Wal basses, purchasing two Mark I instruments, one with rare African tulipwood facings, the other a cherry solid-body. Karn recorded Japan's last studio album Tin Drum with the Wal and had continued to use these, along with a headless Klein K Bass.

== Personal life ==
Karn had two diplomas in psychotherapy from a West London college, entitling him to call himself "Member of the Associated Stress Consultants, Psychotherapy, and Regression & Hypno-analysis".

== Illness and death ==
In June 2010, Karn announced on his website that he had been diagnosed with advanced-stage cancer. Although the specific type was not disclosed, singer Peter Murphy later stated in an interview that Karn was suffering from terminal brain cancer. According to David Torn, the cancer had already metastasised and Karn was undergoing chemotherapy. The announcement on Karn's website explained that he had been experiencing financial difficulties for some time and appealed for donations to help cover medical expenses and support his family. Several musicians and collaborators, including Midge Ure, Porcupine Tree, and Masami Tsuchiya, organised benefit concerts in support of the appeal. An update posted on 3 September 2010 stated that the funds raised had enabled Karn and his family to return to London, where he continued treatment. His cancer later spread beyond the possibility of treatment and he died at his home in London on 4 January 2011..

== Discography ==
=== Albums ===
For albums with Japan (and Rain Tree Crow) see Japan discography.

==== Solo albums ====
Album title	Release year	Record label	UK
Titles	1982	Virgin	No.74
Dreams of Reason Produce Monsters	1987	Virgin	No.89
Bestial Cluster	1993	CMP	
The Tooth Mother	1995	CMP	
Each Eye a Path	2001	Medium	
Each Path a Remix	2003	Medium	
More Better Different	2004	Invisible Hands	
Love's Glove EP	2005	MK	
Three Part Species	2006	MK	
The Concrete Twin	2009	MK	

==== Collaborative albums ====
Album title	Artist	Release year	Record label	UK
Dance	with Gary Numan and others	1981	Beggars Banquet	
A Place in the Sun (original title En plats i solen)	with Lustans Lakejer, Richard Barbieri on three tracks	1982	Stranded Rekords	
Chimera	with Bill Nelson on "Glow World"	1983	Mercury	No.30
The Waking Hour	as Dalis Car with Peter Murphy	1984	Beggars Banquet	No.84
The Sensual World	with Kate Bush on "Heads We're Dancing"	1989	EMI	
Lonely Universe	with Michael White, Michel Lambert, David Torn, Mick Karn	1990	CMP	
Beginning to Melt	as Jansen-Barbieri-Karn	1993	Medium UK	
Polytown	as David Torn, Mick Karn, Terry Bozzio	1994	CMP	
Seed EP	Jansen-Barbieri-Karn	1994	Medium UK	
Truth?	with Sugizo	1997	Cross	
Liquid Glass	with Yoshihiro Hanno	1998	Medium	
-ism	Jansen-Barbieri-Karn	2000	Medium UK	
Timelines	by Stefano Panunzi with Gavin Harrison, on five tracks	2005	RES	
Endless	by Fjieri, with Barbieri-Harrison-Bowness, as guest on two tracks	2009	Forward Music	
A Rose	by Stefano Panunzi, as guest on two tracks	2009	Emerald	
InGladAloneness EP	by Dalis Car	2011	MK	

==== Compilation albums ====
- The Mick Karn Collector's Edition (CMP, 1996)
- Selected (MK, 2007)

=== Singles ===
- "Sensitive" (Virgin, 1982) – UK No. 98
- "After a Fashion" (1983) – with Midge Ure, UK No. 39
- "Buoy" (Virgin, 1987) featuring David Sylvian, UK No. 63
- "Of & About" (MK, 2006)

== Written works ==
- Japan & Self Existence publisher: MK Music. Biography, covering his life from 1958 to 2006.
