= InGladAloneness =

EP by Dalis Car
- Released: 5 April 2012
- Recorded: 2010
- Studio: Silesia Sound (Berkhamsted); Malt Barn (Oxford); Vestry (Ealing)
- Genre: Post-punk
- Length: 19:25

Dalis Car chronology
The Waking Hour (1984)	InGladAloneness (2012)

InGladAloneness is an EP by Dalis Car, a collaboration between Peter Murphy of Bauhaus and Mick Karn of Japan.

== Background ==
In August 2010, Murphy announced on Twitter that he and Karn were planning to head into the studio in September to begin work on the second Dalis Car album. The project was cut short, however, as Karn had recently been diagnosed with cancer. He died on 4 January 2011. The recordings feature Karn's Japan bandmate Steve Jansen on drums and original Dalis Car drummer Paul Lawford on congas.

== Release ==
The track "Artemis Rise" was first made available as a download through the Burning Shed MK Music store on 24 July 2011, to commemorate what would have been Karn's 53rd birthday. The song is an updated version of the song "Artemis" from their 1984 album The Waking Hour, with added vocals by Murphy, drums by Jansen and guitar by Jakszyk.

"Artemis Rise", along with four other tracks, were released as the InGladAloneness EP on 5 April 2012. The tracks were mixed by Jansen, mastered by Pieter Snapper in Istanbul and the artwork for the EP was created by Thomas Bak with a painting by Jarosław Kukowski. The Japanese version of the EP contains a memorial photo booklet with photos of Karn by Steve Jansen, along with comments from artists who had collaborated with him.

The first 250 copies were signed by Jansen.

== Track listing ==
All lyrics are written by Peter Murphy; all music is composed by Mick Karn and Peter Murphy, except where noted

No.	Title	Writer(s)	Length
1.	"King Cloud"	lyrics by David Hornsby	5:01
2.	"Sound Cloud"		4:25
3.	"Artemis Rise"		4:52
4.	"Subhanallah"	Traditional	2:16
5.	"If You Go Away (cover of "Ne Me Quitte Pas")"	Jacques Brel	2:51

== Personnel ==
- Peter Murphy – vocals, keyboards
- Mick Karn – bass, bass clarinet, additional guitars

Additional musicians

- Steve Jansen – drums
- Jakko M Jakszyk – nylon acoustic guitars, electric guitars, guzheng
- Theo Travis – saxophones, flute
- Şengül – additional vocals on "Subhanallah"
- Gill Morley – violin
- Ellen Blair – violin, viola
- Pete Lockett – percussion
- Paul Lawford – congas
- Steve D'Agostino – additional keyboards

Technical

- Jarosław Kukowski – painting
- Thomas Bak – artwork
- Steve Jansen – string arrangement on "If You Go Away", mixing
- Jakko M Jakszyk – string arrangements
- Pieter Snapper – mastering
