= Waking Hour =

Waking Hour may refer to:

- Waking Hour (album), an album by Vienna Teng
- Waking Hours, an album by Del Amitri
- The Waking Hour, an album by Dalis Car
