= Dalis Car =

English musical group formed in 1984

Dalís Car
- Origin: England
- Genres: Post-punk, art rock
- Years active: 1984, 2010
- Label: Beggars Banquet
- Past members: Peter Murphy; Mick Karn; Paul Vincent Lawford

Dalís Car were a musical group formed in 1984 by Peter Murphy (vocalist), Mick Karn (bassist, keyboardist, guitarist, saxophonist) and Paul Vincent Lawford (drum machines).

== History ==
One year after Bauhaus broke up, Peter Murphy, after taking a hiatus from his music career, wished again to record. However, Murphy at the time did not have significant skill as an instrumentalist and with Bauhaus he typically wrote lyrics after the other band members wrote the music: "As a solo artist I had to learn to make records without this machine I had been part of. I had no skill. No idea what I should do. I was suddenly a solo person writing from where? From what perspective? So I was looking to find what I had to offer." Murphy was in need of a collaborator at the time. Around the same time, the bass player Mick Karn, from the art pop band Japan who had split up in 1982, was struggling with his solo career. Despite his musical ability, recorded demos and session work, Karn was struggling to get a record deal since he was mainly interested in making instrumental music rather than pop songs. Drummer Paul Lawford had been auditioned by Karn in late 1982, and worked with him on rehearsals and demos throughout 1983 and 1984. Karn: "He was very important in the making of the album". In order to secure a record deal, he needed to convince a record company that his work had commercial prospects. Karn was looking for a frontman.

The origin of the band began with Murphy's interview by a Japanese journalist for the magazine Music Life, in which he spoke of his admiration for Mick Karn's work and his unique bass style. The same journalist interviewed Karn a week before Murphy's interview and had Karn's telephone number. Murphy jotted Karn's number down, and telephoned him for a conversation. This led to a meeting and dinner in a restaurant, and each discovered that they had a connection with the other, leading to the creation of Dalís Car along with drummer Paul Vincent Lawford. It was assumed that they took their name from a Captain Beefheart song from his album Trout Mask Replica. Despite the popular belief, this was apocryphal. Instead, the name came from a dream from Murphy's friend, where he dreamed of buying a car belonging to Salvador Dalí.

There were issues and conflicts during the recording sessions, but these were resolved positively. Karn explained one issue on how each of them had a different way to construct music: "There would be whole sections I'd leave for the vocals to take over the track, whereas Pete saw it from a completely different musical perspective; "Well, this is such a nice musical break I don't want to touch it. "So I guess there was a certain amount of friction caused by that because we both heard the tracks in a completely different way." Paul Lawford contributed rhythm arrangements for two tracks that Karn constructed songs around. They performed the album track "His Box" on BBC2's The Old Grey Whistle Test. One commentator mentioned their reaction to their appearance in the performance by saying: "In their sober suits they looked like investment bankers who had just had a bad day on the stock market".

The group recorded only one album, titled The Waking Hour. The album went over budget and was not successful, and despite Karn's willingness to continue with the group, Murphy was not interested based on the lack of success. In fact, he did not even show up when Karn established the bonus tracks for their single, preferring to stay in Turkey with his wife. According to Karn, "by that point it became obvious that Peter didn't want to carry on with it." Murphy later recalled that "we split up in 1984 on not very good terms. He'd just come out of Japan and I'd just finished with Bauhaus, and relationships in our previous bands had ended badly so neither of us found it easy working together back then." Paul Lawford was invited to play on Peter Murphy's solo album "Should The World Fail To Fall Apart".

=== The Waking Hour ===
The sleeve of The Waking Hour features a detail from Maxfield Parrish's seminal painting Daybreak. The album was recorded at The Manor and Herne Place, mixed at Air Studios and was engineered by Steve Churchyard. Demo tracks were recorded at Nomis Studios. One single was released, "The Judgement Is the Mirror" (UK No. 66). Much of the video for the single was recorded on location in Malta.

=== Reunion and subsequent releases ===
In August 2010, Peter Murphy announced on Twitter that he and Karn were planning to head into the studio in September to begin work on the second Dalís Car album. As Murphy explained that year:

I hadn't seen him for ages and then I heard he was seriously ill in June of last year. I was sat here wondering what I could do for him because we'd made a whole album together, so we got back in contact with each other via email and I asked him whether he was well enough to work, and if so, why don't we make another Dalis Car album? I'll raise the funds and organise it all, you just get writing, and he was so happy.

The project was cut short, however, for Karn had recently been diagnosed with cancer; he died on 4 January 2011. The tracks they did record—including a re-working of "Artemis" from The Waking Hour with newly added vocals, guitar, and drums, and renamed "Artemis Rise"—were released on 5 April 2012 as an EP titled InGladAloneness. The tracks were mixed by Steve Jansen, mastered by Pieter Snapper in Istanbul, and the artwork for the EP was created by Murphy with Thomas Bak with a painting by Jarosław Kukowski. The Japanese version of the EP contains a memorial photo booklet with photos by Steve Jansen along with comments from fellow artists who have collaborated with Karn.

Artemis Rise was made available as a download through the Burning Shed MK Music store on Sunday 24 July 2011, to commemorate what would have been Karn's 53rd birthday. The song is an updated version of the song as it appeared on The Waking Hour, with added vocals by Murphy, drums by Jansen, and guitar by Jakszyk.

== Discography ==
=== Studio albums ===
- The Waking Hour (1984) – UK No. 84

=== Singles ===
- "The Judgement Is the Mirror" (1984) – UK No. 66

=== EPs ===
- InGladAloneness (2012)
