= Titles (album) =

Studio album by Mick Karn
- Released: November 1982
- Recorded: July–August 1982
- Studio: Studio 4, AIR, London
- Genre: Art pop; synthpop
- Length: 40:44
- Label: Virgin
- Producer: Mick Karn; Colin Fairley

Mick Karn chronology
Titles (1982)	Dreams of Reason Produce Monsters (1987)

Singles from Titles
- 1. "Sensitive" Released: June 1982

Professional ratings
Review scores
Source	Rating
AllMusic	3/5 stars
Smash Hits	6.5/10

Titles is the debut solo studio album by the English new wave artist Mick Karn, released in 1982. The album peaked at No. 74 on the UK Album Chart.

== History ==
Titles was released in November 1982, shortly after Karn's band Japan had announced their intention to split up. Karn recorded the album in London during July and August 1982, and Japan drummer Steve Jansen and keyboard player Richard Barbieri both worked as session musicians on the album. In contrast to the work of his former band, Karn opted to work more quickly in writing and recording the material. The album was completed in 28 days and, according to Karn, the running order of the tracks are the same as the order they were recorded.

The track "Sensitive" is a reworking of the Roberto Carlos song "À Distância" (both Carlos and Karn are credited as writers). It was originally produced by Karn with Ricky Wilde and released as a single in June 1982, though failed to chart. A new version of the track was recorded for the album, and it was re-released as a single in January 1983 when it peaked at No. 98.

== Track listing ==
All compositions by Mick Karn except where noted.

Side one

1. "Tribal Dawn" 4:10
2. "Lost Affections in a Room" 4:17
3. "Passion in Moisture" 4:12
4. "Weather the Windmill" 3:54

Side two

5. "Saviour, Are You With Me?" (trad., arr by Mick Karn) 4:05
6. "Trust Me" 4:57
7. "Sensitive" (Roberto Carlos, Mick Karn) 4:35
8. "Piper Blue" 4:21

Bonus track on 1990 CD release

9. "The Sound of Waves" 6:11
- "The Sound of Waves" had been previously issued as the B-side to the album's only single release, "Sensitive".

== Personnel ==
- Mick Karn – fretless bass, saxophone, clarinet, bassoon, ocarinas, recorder (tracks 3 and 8), African flute (tracks 3 and 7), percussion (except track 7), keyboards, vocals, drum machine (tracks 3, 6, and 8), keyboard programming (tracks 4 and 8), producer
- Richard Barbieri – keyboard programming (except tracks 4 and 8)
- Hugh Burns – guitar (track 5)
- Colin Fairley – percussion (track 1), producer, engineer, remixing
- David Jacobs – assistant engineer
- Steve Jansen – congas (track 1), cymbal (track 7)
- David Rhodes – guitar (track 6)
- Tim Summerhays – engineer
- Angie Usher – vocals (track 5)
- Ricky Wilde – keyboards (track 7), drum machine (track 7), producer, mixing
