= Chimera (Bill Nelson album) =

Studio album (mini-album) by Bill Nelson
- Released: May 1983
- Recorded: Autumn 1982
- Studio: The Garden, London; Riverside, London; Alfa Studio "A", Tokyo
- Genre: Synth-pop
- Length: 27:31
- Label: Mercury
- Producer: Bill Nelson

Bill Nelson chronology
Flaming Desire and Other Passions (1982)	Chimera (1983)	Dancing on a Knife's Edge (1983)

Singles from Chimera
- 1. "Acceleration (Remix)" Released: August 1984

Chimera is the fourth (Note: If the album Sounding the Ritual Echo (Atmospheres for Dreaming) (1981) is counted, Chimera is technically Nelson's fifth studio album. However, Sounding the Ritual Echo, an instrumental album originally packaged with limited copies of Quit Dreaming and Get on the Beam (1981), did not have a standalone release until 1985, so Chimera is, in effect, Nelson's fourth solo studio album release.) studio album by English musician Bill Nelson. The album was released in May 1983 and was self-produced. Consisting of six tracks with a total length below thirty minutes, it has often been categorized as a mini album. Notable musicians Yukihiro Takahashi and Mick Karn made guest appearances.

It is the final in a trilogy of albums with Mercury Records, including Quit Dreaming and Get on the Beam (1981) and The Love That Whirls (Diary of a Thinking Heart) (1982). It reached no. 30 in the UK albums chart.

== Background and recording ==
The recording sessions that produced Chimera occurred in Autumn 1982, and it was originally intended as a four-track extended play for release in the following November. The album is in part a collaborative effort with Japanese drummer Yukihiro Takahashi, and in an August 1983 interview for Electronics & Music Maker, Nelson described the work process:

I'd worked with Yukihiro Takahashi from YMO on his solo album called What, Me Worry?, playing E-bow guitar. After doing that I asked him if he'd be interested in providing me with some rhythm tracks to write to and he said he'd love to do it, went back to Japan and prepared everything. I had given Yuki a rough idea of what I was looking for, so he put some things down on 24-track tape and sent them to me. ... I then wrote the songs around the rhythm patterns, worked the instrument parts out, and went into the studio and reproduced them back on to the 24-track tape.

Also notable on the album is Mick Karn playing bass on "Glow World". At the time of recording, he was also the bassist in the band Japan, but the group would soon dissolve the same year in December. In the same interview, Nelson explained that he met Karn when they worked on the Masami Tsuchiya album Rice Music (1982), and that, besides "Glow World", Karn played on two other tracks that did not make it onto Chimera.

== Release ==
Chimera peaked at no. 30 on the UK albums chart. One single from the album, "Acceleration", was remixed and released more than a year later in August 1984, peaking at no. 78 on the UK singles chart and at no. 4 on the UK independent singles chart.

== Critical reception ==
Professional ratings
Review scores
Source	Rating
AllMusic	4.5/5 stars
The Encyclopedia of Popular Music	3/5 stars
The Great Rock Discography	7/10
Number One	2/5 stars
Record Mirror	5/5 stars
Smash Hits	4.5/10

In a contemporary review for Melody Maker, Helen Fitzgerald said "[Nelson and Takahashi's] combined talents have produced a record of subtle and fluent atmosphere ... Chimera experiments within the varied and exciting field of technical and mechanical precision, yet is stamped with a softly fluid human element that elevates it beyond a self-indulgent experiment in electronic gameplaying." In a five star review for Record Mirror, Betty Page said "This mini-LP contains six sublimely well-constructed electro-based tunes guaranteed to make the tiredest ears perk up."

Not all reviews were positive. Josephine Hocking of Smash Hits believed that Chimera was "overly ambitious" and "ineffective", Lynn Hanna of Number One magazine felt the album was "Too clever for pure pop, not daring enough for real experiment," and Jim Green of Trouser Press said "What Chimera lacks is one song that's an unquestionable gem."

In a retrospective assessment for AllMusic, Dan LeRoy said "Chimera turned out to be a welcome showcase for Bill Nelson at his peak, commercially and creatively. Following the triumph of his 1982 album The Love That Whirls, the British guitarist built Chimera in the same vein, setting his romantic and erotic poetry to the sort of synthesized settings favored by his younger pop peers."

== Track listing ==
All tracks are written by Bill Nelson.

Chimera track listing
No.	Title	Length
1.	"The Real Adventure"	4:13
2.	"Acceleration"	3:58
3.	"Everyday Feels Like Another New Drug"	4:40
4.	"Tender Is the Night"	5:11
5.	"Glow World"	4:05
6.	"Another Day, Another Ray of Hope"	5:24
Total length:		27:31

== Personnel ==
Credits are adapted from the original LP release of Chimera on Mercury.

- Bill Nelson – vocals, synthesizers (Casio MT-30, Yamaha CS-70M, Minimoog, ARP Omni), bass (tracks 1, 2, 4, 6), electric guitars (1, 2, 4), artificial orchestra (1, 2, 5), marimbas (1, 4), synthetic horns (3), radio/TV cut-ups (3), white noise (3), drums (4), acoustic guitars (5), E-bow guitars (6), drum computer (6), piano (6)
- Yukihiro Takahashi – drums (1, 2, 3, 5)
- Preston Heyman – percussion (3, 5, 6), tom toms (6)
- Ian Nelson – saxophone (2, 3)
- Jan Nelson – backing vocals (2)
- Mick Karn – bass (5)

Technical and design

- Bill Nelson – production, engineering, rear cover photography
- Nick Froome, Peter Williams, Mitsuo Koike – engineering
- Léon Phillips, Mick Robson, Akitsugu Doi – assistant engineering
- Hideki Matsutake – computer programme, PCM sound memory manipulation
- Roger Groves – front cover photography
- Roger Harrison – photographic printing

== Charts ==
=== Album ===
Chart (1983)	Peak position
UK Albums (OCC)	30

=== Singles ===
"Acceleration (Remix)"
Chart (1984)	Peak position
UK Singles (OCC)	78
UK Independent Singles (MRIB)	4
