= Jarosław Kukowski =

Polish contemporary painter

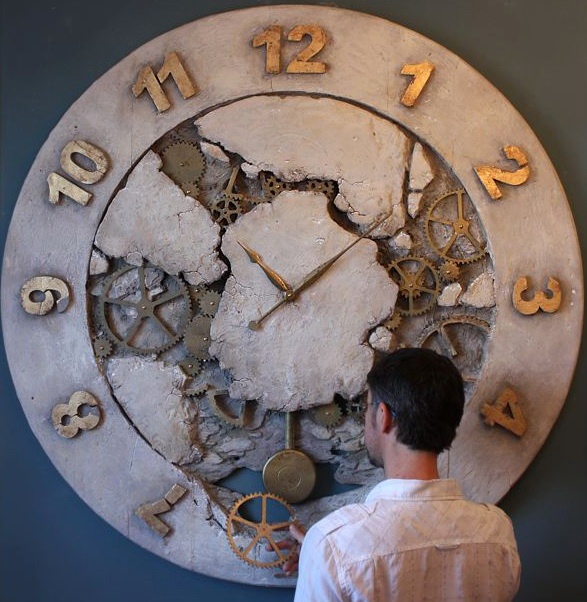
- J. Kukowski with one of his works from the "Memento" series
- Born: 1972 (age 53–54); Tczew
- Style: Painting
- Movement: Surrealism, magical realism
- Website: kukowski.pl

Jarosław Kukowski (born 11 April 1972 in Tczew) is a Polish contemporary painter, juror of international art competitions (including The World's Greatest Erotic Art of Today). His works were exhibited, among others Branch Museum of the National-Królikarnia Salons Rempex Auction House, the Museum of Galicia, the Contemporary Art Gallery, Castle Voergaard, the Art Expo New York and many other galleries and museums in the world. He is considered one of the most influential contemporary creators of the Surrealist circle.

== Information on his work ==
In the early period of his work, the atmosphere of his works, considered symbolic, is saturated with drama and sadness. Painful deformed human figures and mythical creatures are shown against a surreal background landscapes. This series of works was defined by the author as non-dreams. In the next period Kukowski definitely brightened his palette. The dominant theme of his paintings became nudes, but even here the mark of disintegration and the passage of time is felt. These works have been painted in the form of frescoes destroyed by time and revealing completely different images under them. In the next phase of the work, Kukowski referred to his first works, but despite his lighter tones his paintings became more and more ironic and provocative.

The artist also cooperates with musicians and avant-garde artists. His works are used for illustrative forms related to contemporary music (he collaborates with the Theater of Creation and the alternative formation of Peter Murphy - Dali's Car - a record - "InGladAloneness".

== The most important work cycles ==
=== Painting cycles ===
- "Dreams"
- "Non-dreams"
- "Frescoes"
- "Golden series"

=== Installations ===
- "Memento" is a combination of sculpture, painting and monumental clocks. The cycle "Memento" is a development of the painter's series "Frescos" realized by the creator in the 90s. The clocks were displayed in many galleries and museums (among others, Zachęta, and in the Diocesan Museum in Pelplin).

He is also the creator of animations documenting the creative process of his paintings.

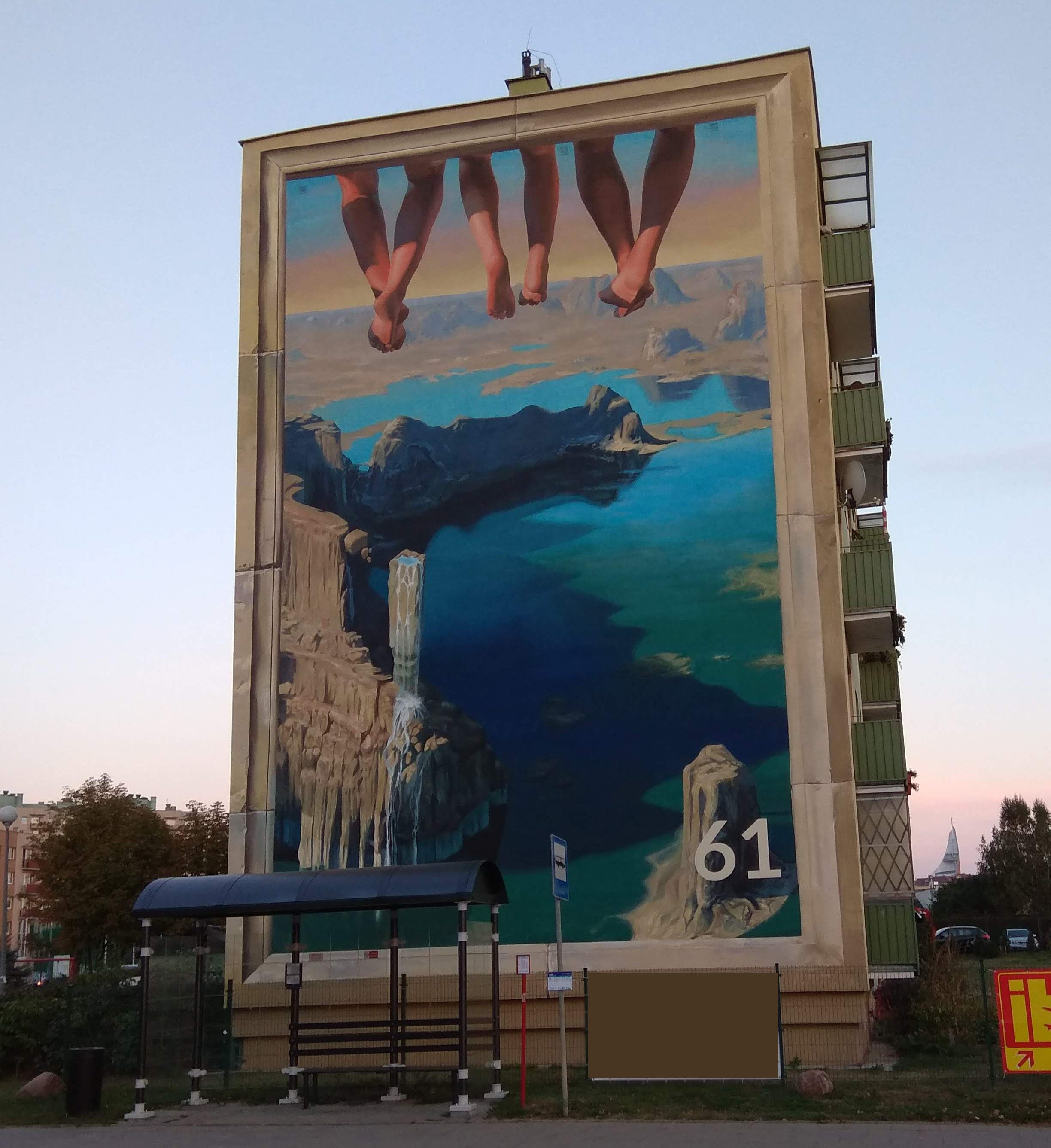
3D Mural by Jarosław Kukowski, made in 2018 in Tczew

== Works in public space ==
- Diocesan Museum in Pelplin (two objects from the "Memento" series)
- Museum of Julian Ochorowicz in Wisła
- Mural at Armii Krajowej Street in Tczew

== Exhibitions and displays ==
- 1993 – Bruwssum, Denmark
- 1994 – Galeria “Plama” Gdańsk, Poland
- 1994 – Castle of Knights of the Order of St. John of Jerusalem, Poland
- 1994 – “N” Gallery, Starogard Gdański, Poland
- 1994 – “CSW Stara Łaźnia” Galeria, Gdańsk, Poland
- 1996 – SD Wilanów Gallery, Warsaw, Poland
- 1997 – Teatr “Miniatura”, Gdańsk, Poland
- 1998 – Adi Art Gallery, Łódź, Poland
- 1998 – Wilczeniec, Warsaw, Poland
- 1999 – Muzeum Diecezjalne, Pelplin, Poland
- 1999 – Wilczeniec, Warsaw, Poland
- 2000 – SD Wilanów Gallery, Warsaw, Poland
- 2001 – Nationwide Antiquarianism and Contemporary Art Fairs, Kraków, Poland
- 2002 – ARTEXPO, New York, USA
- 2002 – The National Museum, the Królikarnia Palace, Warsaw, Poland
- 2002 – ”Polish Surrealists” exhibition, Panorama Patio Gallery, Warsaw, Poland
- 2003 – Nationwide Antiquarianism and Contemporary Art Fairs, Kraków, Poland
- 2003 – „Nude” exhibition, Gallery of „REMPEX” Auction House, Warsaw, Poland
- 2003 – The National Museum of Art „Painting of the Year 2002”, Warsaw, Poland
- 2003 – Ars Nova Gallery, Łódź, Poland
- 2003 – exhibition in the rooms of ” REMPEX” Auction House, Warsaw, Poland
- 2003 – SD Wilanów Gallery, Warsaw, Poland
- 2004 – SD Wilanów Gallery, Warsaw, Poland
- 2004 – Nationwide Antiquarianism and Contemporary Art Fairs, Kraków, Poland
- 2004 – BP Gallery, Warsaw, Poland
- 2004 – Exhibition in the gallery of ” REMPEX” Auction House, Warsaw, Poland
- 2004 – Galerie Bram, Denmark
- 2004 – Program Gallery: exhibition presenting finalists, Warsaw, Poland
- 2005 – The Turlej Foundation Gallery, Kraków, Poland
- 2005 – Galeria Sztuki Współczesnej, Kołobrzeg, Poland
- 2005 – Voregaard Castle, Dania
- 2007 – Modern Art Gallery, Kołobrzeg, Poland
- 2007 – SD Wilanów Gallery, Warsaw, Poland
- 2008 – SOHO Studios Miami, USA
- 2008 – Conseil des Arts du Quebec, Montreal, Canada
- 2008 – Wynwood Art District Miami, USA
- 2008 – Beate Ushe Erotik Museum, Berlin, Niemcy
- 2008 – World Art Erotic Art Museum, Miami USA
- 2008 – „Polish Surrealists”, SD Panorama Patio Gallery, Warsaw, Poland
- 2009 – BOXeight Studios & Gallery, Los Angeles, USA
- 2009 – WSC Miami, USA
- 2009 – Galeria ZPAP, Łódź, Poland
- 2009 – Płocka Galeria Sztuki, "Widzialne Niewidzialne", Płock, Poland
- 2010 – California Modern Art Gallery, San Francisco, USA
- 2011 – ZACHĘTA Narodowa Galeria Sztuki, Warsaw, Poland
- 2011 – Muzeum Miejskie Wrocławia, Wrocław, Poland
- 2012 – „Geysers of Subconsciousness 8” Moscow, Russia
- 2012 – Galeria Sztuki Współczesnej BWA, Katowice, Poland
- 2012 – Galeria Sztuki Współczesnej, Włocławek, Poland
- 2012 – Beskidzka Galeria Sztuki, Szczyrk, Poland
- 2012 – MOK, Gniezno, Poland
- 2012 – Galeria Sztuki Współczesnej, Kołobrzeg, Poland
- 2012 – Millenium Hall, Rzeszów, Poland
- 2013 – Galeria Sztuki Współczesnej, Kołobrzeg, Poland
- 2013 – Muzeum Miejskie we Wrocławiu, Poland
- 2013 – ZACHĘTA Narodowa Galeria Sztuki Warszawa, Poland
- 2014 – V.A. Gallery Poland, Poznań, Poland
- 2014 – Muzeum Diecezjalne, Pelplin, Poland
- 2014 – Dom Artysty Plastyka, Warsaw, Poland
- 2014 – Millenium Hall w Rzeszowie, Poland
- 2014 – Galeria Sztuki Współczesnej BWA w Katowicach, Poland
- 2014 – Muzeum Historyczne Miasta Gdańsk, Gdańsk, Poland
- 2015 – Galeria Quantum, Warsaw, Poland
- 2015 – „Geysers of Subconsciousness” Kaługa, Russia
- 2015 – Bator Art Gallery, Szczyrk, Poland
- 2015 – Muzeum Miejskie Wrocławia, Wrocław, Poland
- 2015 – Fabryka Sztuk, Tczew, Poland
- 2015 – ZACHĘTA Narodowa Galeria Sztuki, Warsaw, Poland
- 2016 – Hopfenmuseum, Wolnzach, Germany
- 2016 – Galeria PRO ARTE, Zielona Góra, Poland
- 2016 – Galeria Miejska, Wrocław, Poland
- 2016 – Centrum Promocji Kultury Praga, Warsaw, Poland
- 2016 – Galeria Sztuki Współczesnej BWA, Katowice, Poland
- 2016 – Filharmonia Podkarpacka im. Artura Malawskiego, Rzeszów, Poland
- 2016 – Muzeum Miasta Gdańsk – Ratusz, Gdańsk, Poland
- 2017 – Galeria Sztuki Współczesnej, Włocławek, Poland
- 2017 – NCK Ratusz Staromiejski, Gdańsk, Poland
- 2017 – Galeria Quantum, Warsaw, Poland
- 2017 – ZACHĘTA Narodowa Galeria Sztuki, Warsaw, Poland
- 2018 – Wejherowskie Centrum Kultury, Filharmonia Kaszubska, Wejherowo, Poland
- 2018 – NCK Ratusz Staromiejski, Gdańsk, Poland
- 2018 – Dreamscapes Exhibition, Traun, Austria
- 2018 – Europejskie Centrum Sztuki w Białymstoku, Opera i Filharmonia Podlaska, Białystok, Poland
- 2018 – Galeria Miejska, Wrocław, Poland
- 2018 – Muzeum w Grudziądzu, Poland
