= Dreams of Reason Produce Monsters =

Studio album by Mick Karn
- Released: 16 February 1987
- Recorded: April–May 1986
- Studios: Square One, Bury; Good Earth, London
- Genres: Art pop; progressive pop
- Length: 40:03
- Label: Virgin
- Producers: Mick Karn; Steve Jansen

Mick Karn chronology
Titles (1982)	Dreams of Reason Produce Monsters (1987)	Bestial Cluster (1993)

Singles from Dreams of Reason Produce Monsters
- 1. "Buoy" Released: 5 January 1987

Professional ratings
Review scores
Source	Rating
AllMusic	2.5/5 stars

Dreams of Reason Produce Monsters is the second solo studio album by Mick Karn, released in February 1987. It peaked at number 89 on the UK Albums Chart.

== Release and reception ==
After the release of his debut solo album, Titles, Karn wanted to prove that he was a composer and more than just a bass player. Therefore, on Dreams of Reason Produce Monsters, the bass guitar was not largely used. However, he later thought he should have used more on the album and described it as the weakest album he made.

The album features two of his former Japan bandmates, David Sylvian and Steve Jansen. Sylvian co-wrote and provided vocals on "Buoy" and "When Love Walks In", two of three songs that feature vocals on the album, along with "Answer" which features a choir and ensemble. Sylvian also provided additional keyboards on "Land". Jansen co-produced the album with Karn, and also wrote "Land".

"Buoy" was released as a single in January 1987. It featured "Dreams of Reason" as the B-side and "Language of Ritual" as the second 12-inch single B-side. The single peaked at number 63 on the UK Singles Chart.

Reviewing for New Musical Express, Len Brown was "far from satisfied" with the album, describing it as "by and large an instrumental work; a neo-classical affair; a movie soundtrack in need of images or at least explanations", with several songs "really [amounting] to unaffecting, repetitive ramblings, lacking focus or real direction". However, he did describe "Buoy" as "one clear moment of beauty" that "towers above everything else" on the album. Carole Linfield for Music Week wrote that the album "does touch briefly on the esoteric beauty of Karn's former group Japan", but, "though both acceptable and professional, remains firmly planted in the ambient section. Which is no mean feat, but it's failing is really in the fact that the best track by far is the single".

== Track listing ==
All tracks are written by Mick Karn, except where noted.

No.	Title	Writer(s)	Length
1.	"First Impression"		5:11
2.	"Language of Ritual"		5:39
3.	"Buoy"	Karn, David Sylvian	4:57
4.	"Land"	Steve Jansen	4:25
5.	"The Three Fates"		4:14
6.	"When Love Walks In"	Karn, Sylvian	6:18
7.	"Dreams of Reason"		3:48
8.	"Answer"		5:29
Total length:			40:03

== Personnel ==
Musicians

- Mick Karn – bass, keyboards, soprano saxophone, alto saxophone, tenor saxophone, clarinet, bass clarinet, accordion, dida, drums, percussion, flute, backing vocals
- Steve Jansen – keyboards, drums, percussion, backing vocals
- David Sylvian – vocals (3, 6), additional keyboards (4)
- Eric Willian – E-flat trumpet (1), French horn (5)
- Paul Jones – harmonica
- Bury Church School Choir – choir (8)
- Keith Williams Music Ensemble – ensemble (8)

Technical

- Femi Jiya – engineer, mixing
- Mick Karn – mixing, arrangement, producer, inner sleeve artwork
- Steve Jansen – mixing, arrangement, producer
- Andy Mason – assistant mixing
- David Grow – design
- Richard Haughton – cover photo
- Delicia Burnell – album coordinator

== Charts ==
Chart (1987)	Peak position
UK Albums (Official Charts)	89
