= Diocesan Museum in Pelplin =

Museum in Poland

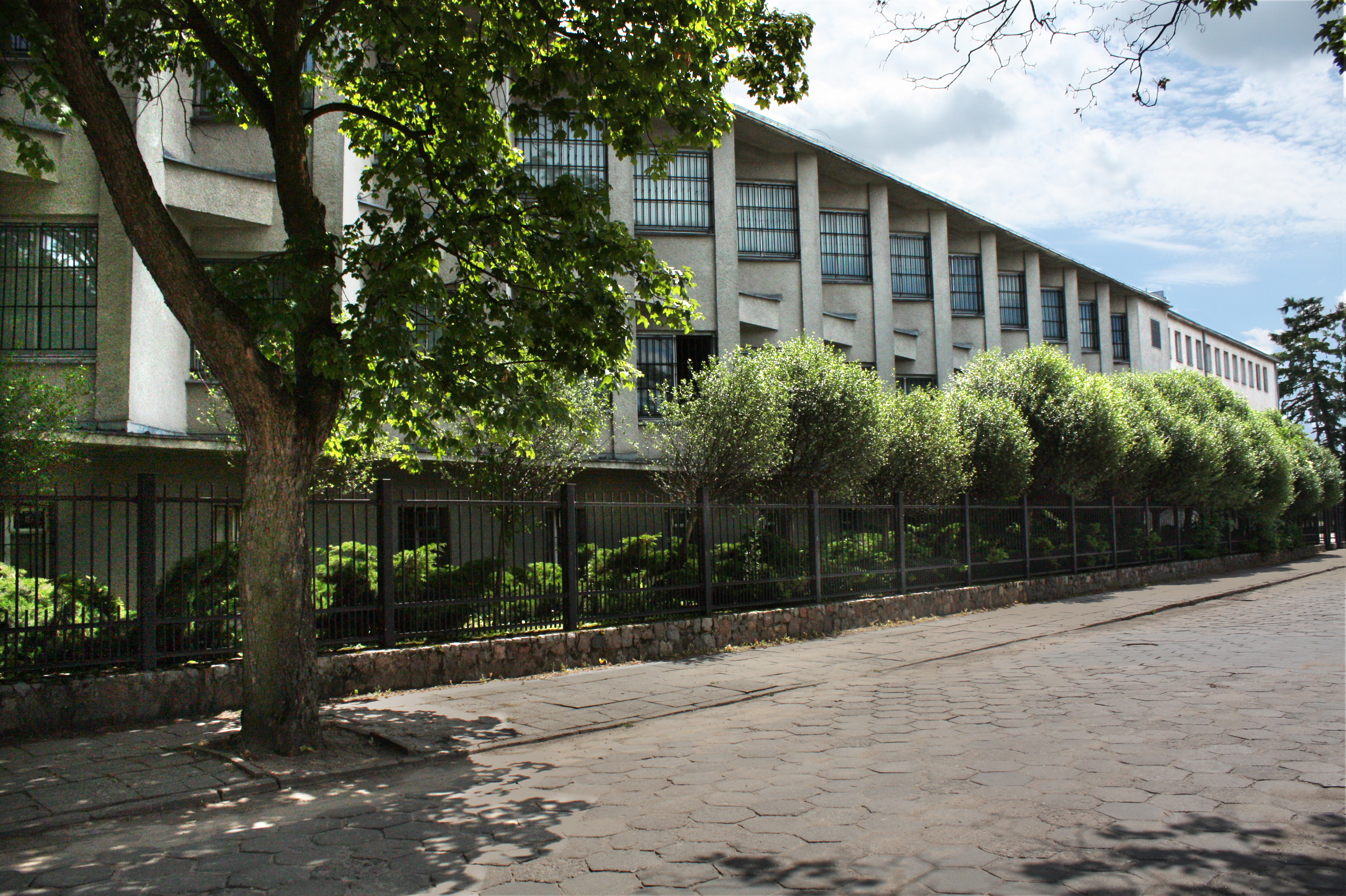
- New building of Diocesan Museum (Muzeum Diecezjalne) in Pelplin
- Established: 1928
- Location: Pelplin, Tczew County, Pomeranian Voivodeship, Poland
- Type: Catholicism, sacred art
- Founder: Bishop Stanisław Wojciech Okoniewski
- Website: www.muzeum.pelplin.diecezja.org/muzeum/

The Diocesan Museum in Pelplin (Polish: Muzeum Diecezjalne w Pelplinie) holds one of the finest collections of medieval art in Poland. It is located in the town of Pelplin in Tczew County (Pomeranian Voivodeship) and is managed by the bishopric of the Roman Catholic Diocese of Pelplin. It bears the name of Bishop Stanisław Wojciech Okoniewski (1870–1944), the founder of the museum (pl), who died in Lisbon during World War II. Founded in the Second Polish Republic in 1928 during the interwar period, the collections have been housed in a modern-style building complex since 1988. Among the museum's most precious objects is Poland's only copy of the Gutenberg Bible.

== Museum collections ==
The largest part of the collections are Gothic sculptures from the churches of the former Diocese of Kulm renamed in 1925 as the Bishopric of Pelplin, and also from the Roman Catholic Diocese of Toruń. Late Gothic paintings of "Crucifixion" from Lignowy (gilded with gold leaf), "Flagellation" (1380), and "Descent from the Cross" (1495) from the Cathedral Basilica of St. John the Baptist and John the Evangelist in Toruń, are supplemented with original art by Hermann Hahn (1570–1628) and Andreas Stech (1635–1697). The museum received generous financial support from the Ministry of Culture and National Heritage for the preventive conservation of paintings from 1420 to 1695.

The Gutenberg Bible (pictured below) held by the museum, originally from the Franciscan monastery in Lubawa, is one of only 48 copies which survived to modern times. Of those, only 20 are complete, and are worth up to $100 million each. It is one of only nine copies surviving in its original 15th century binding,^{[p. 157]} which was added by Henricus Coster of Lübeck. It is printed on both sides of 641 sheets of paper (folios), in two columns measuring 285 mm × 85 mm each, with 40–42 verses, for the total of 1,282 pages of text. Leaves are inserted between some gatherings. During its printing, a loose typesetting sort fell upon a page of this copy and made a mark. This unique feature of the Pelplin Bible enabled scholars to deduce the shape of Gutenberg's type. The binding consists of two beveled oak boards covered in red goat leather, with five brass buttons, corner fittings and buckles fastened to leather straps. The Bible from Pelplin was rescued during World War II by the Polish government, and came to Canada through Paris and London. Kept in a vault at the Bank of Montreal in Ottawa, it was not returned to Poland until 1959.

The museum collections of early prints include the priceless manuscript of St. Augustine of Hippo from 425 titled "De civitate Dei". The collections of the venerated objects of piety contain monstrances and reliquaries from the workshops of Gdańsk, Toruń, and Nuremberg. The collections also include liturgical garments, such as vestments and dalmatics.

== Gallery ==
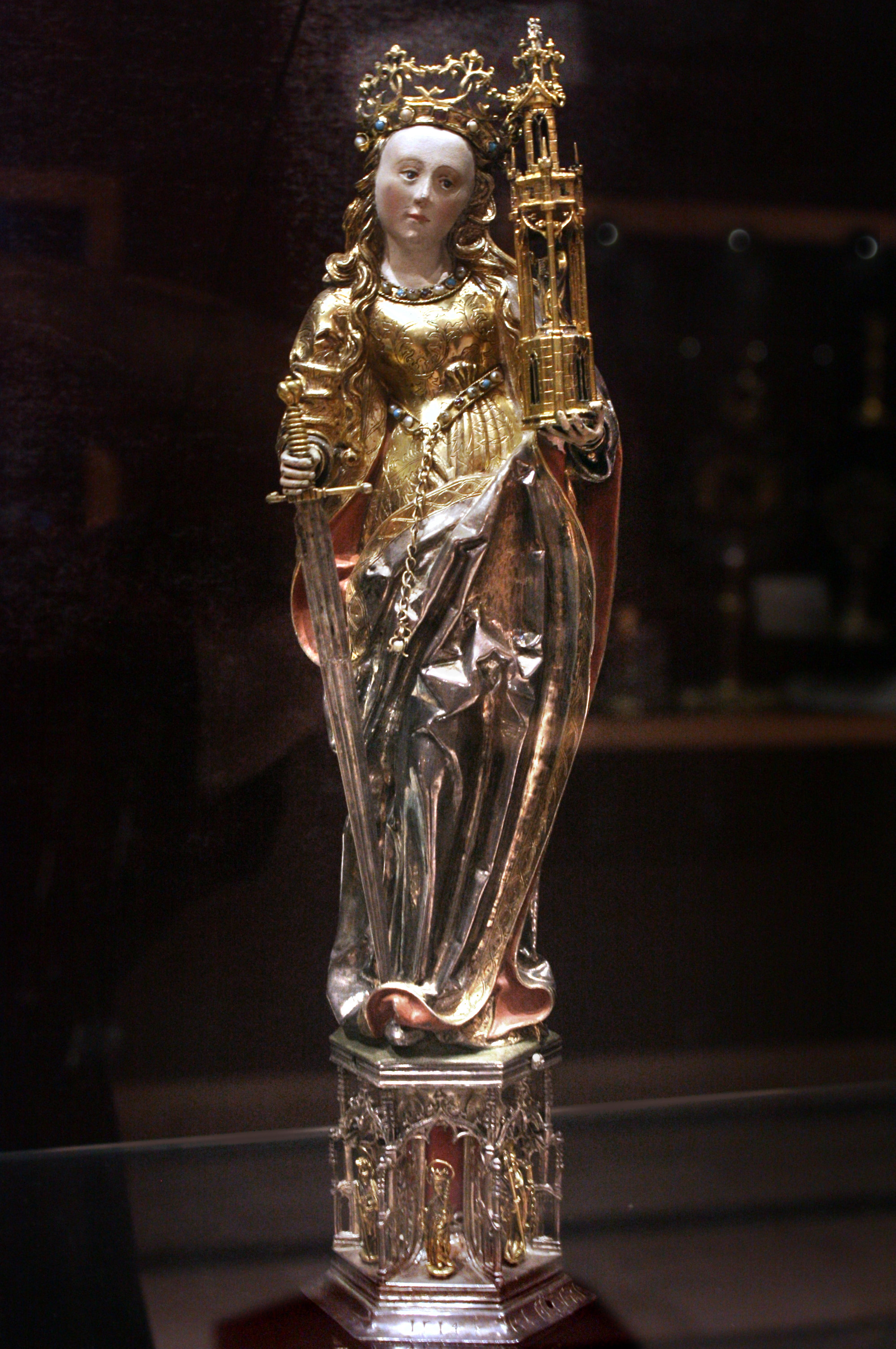
St. Barbara's Reliquary, 1514

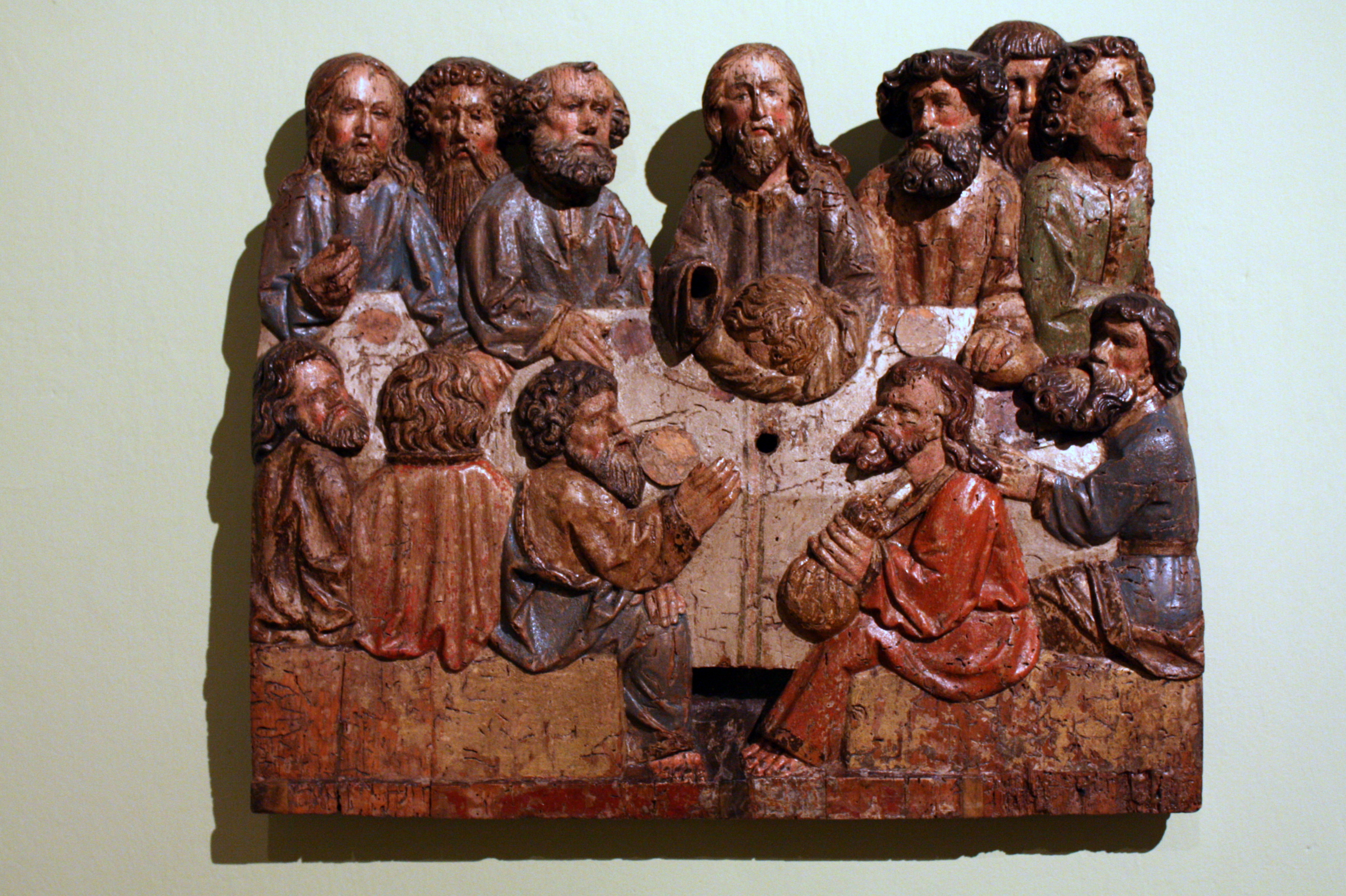

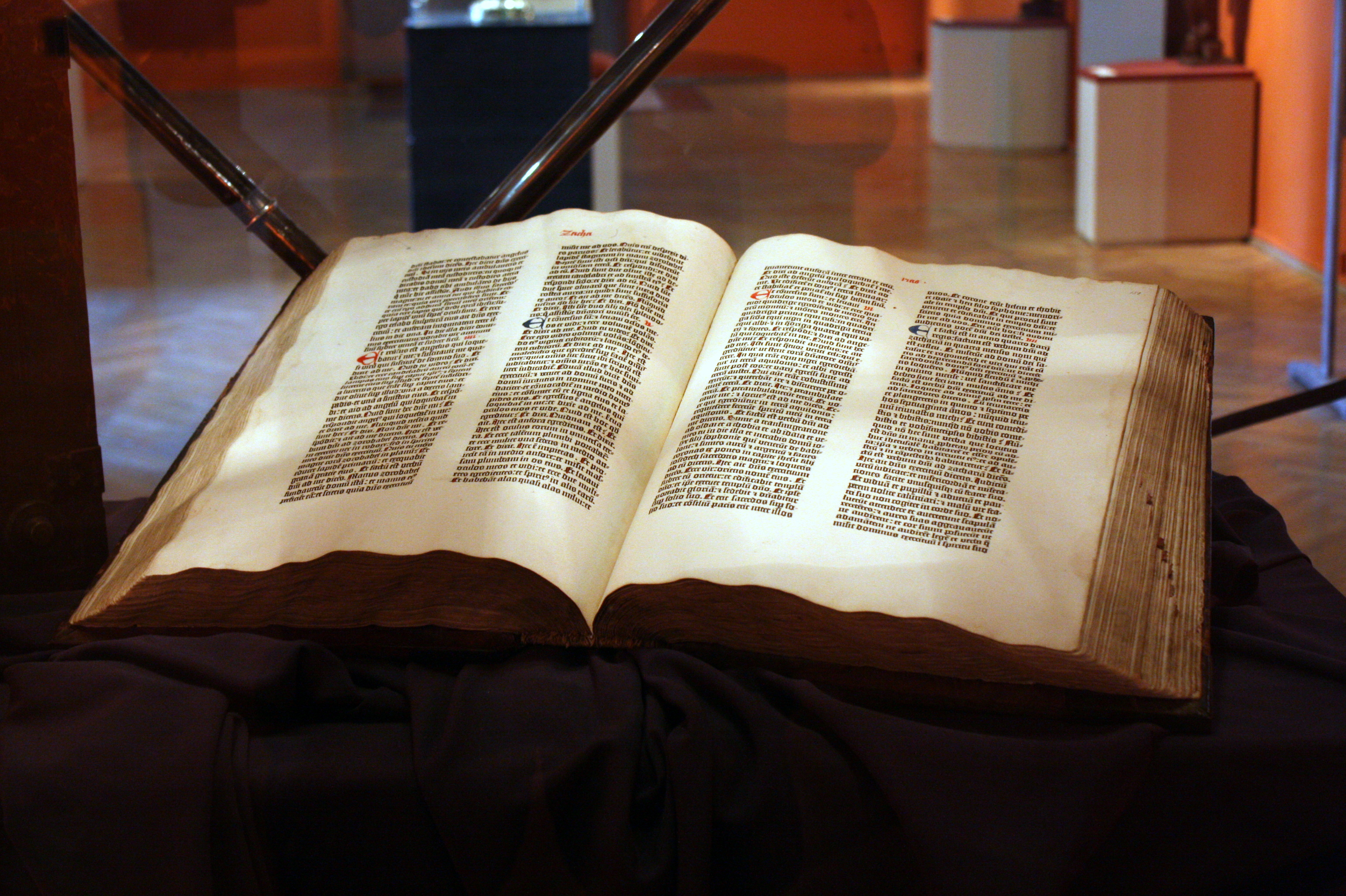
Gutenberg Bible, 15th c.

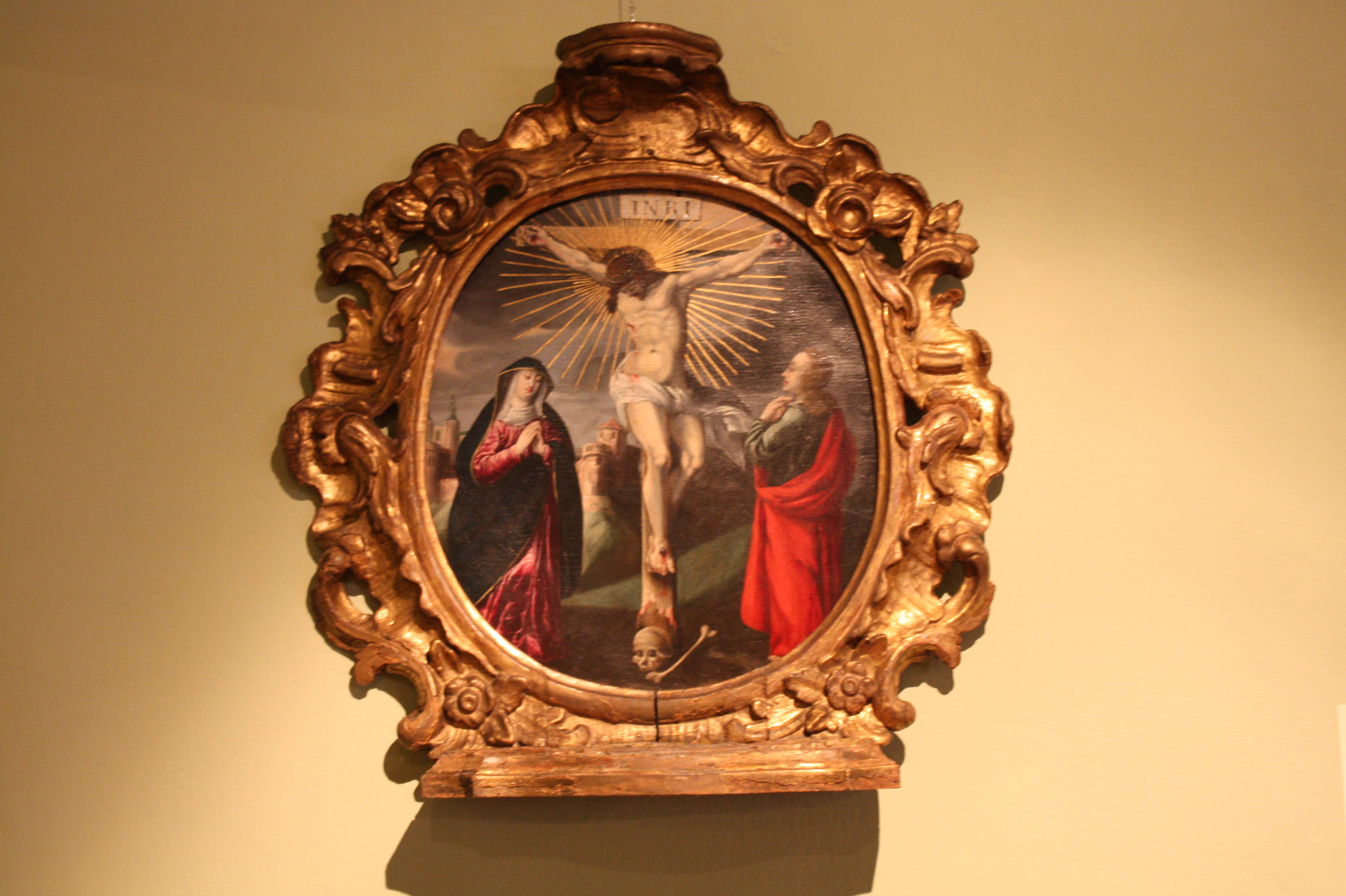

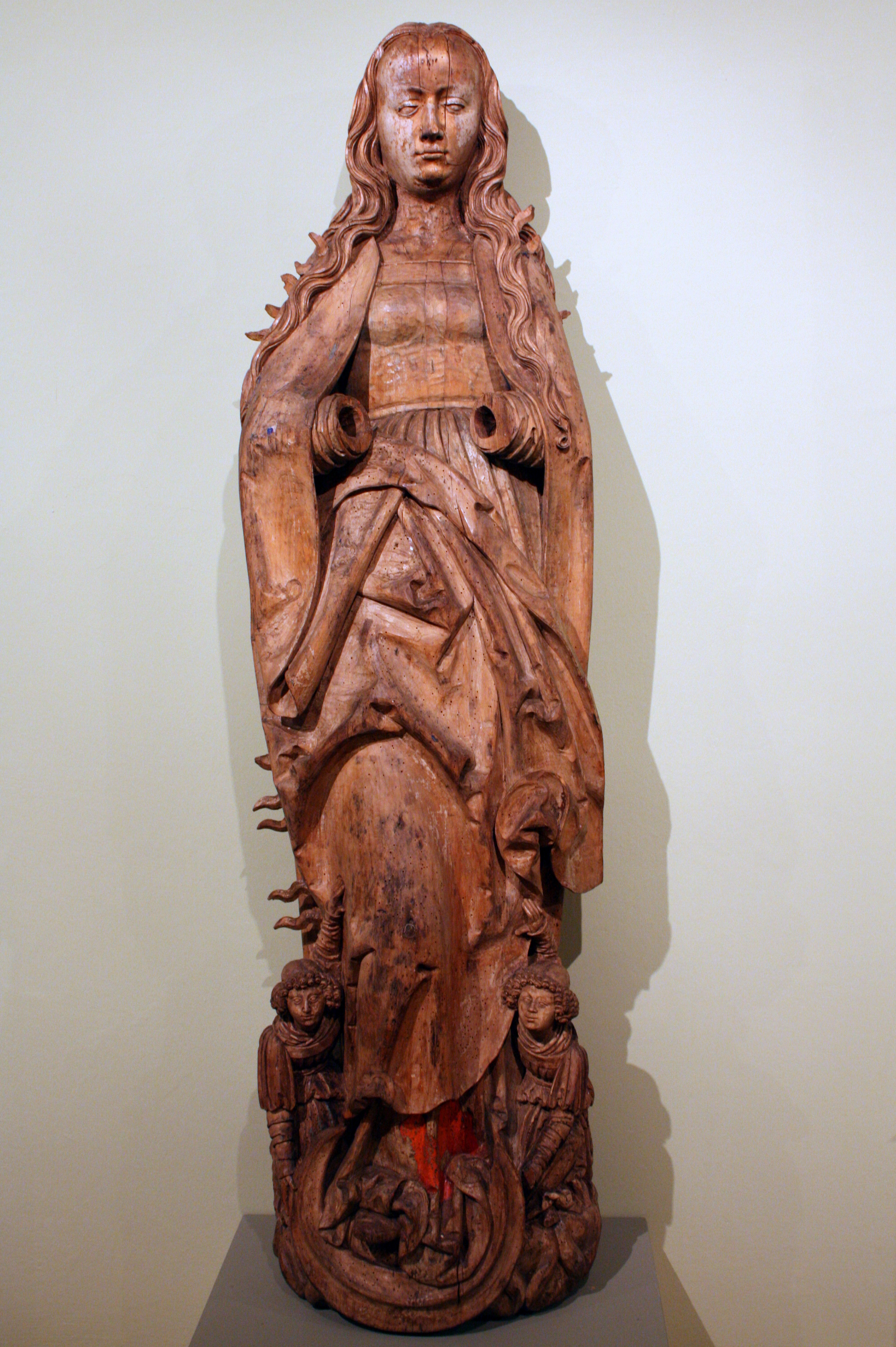

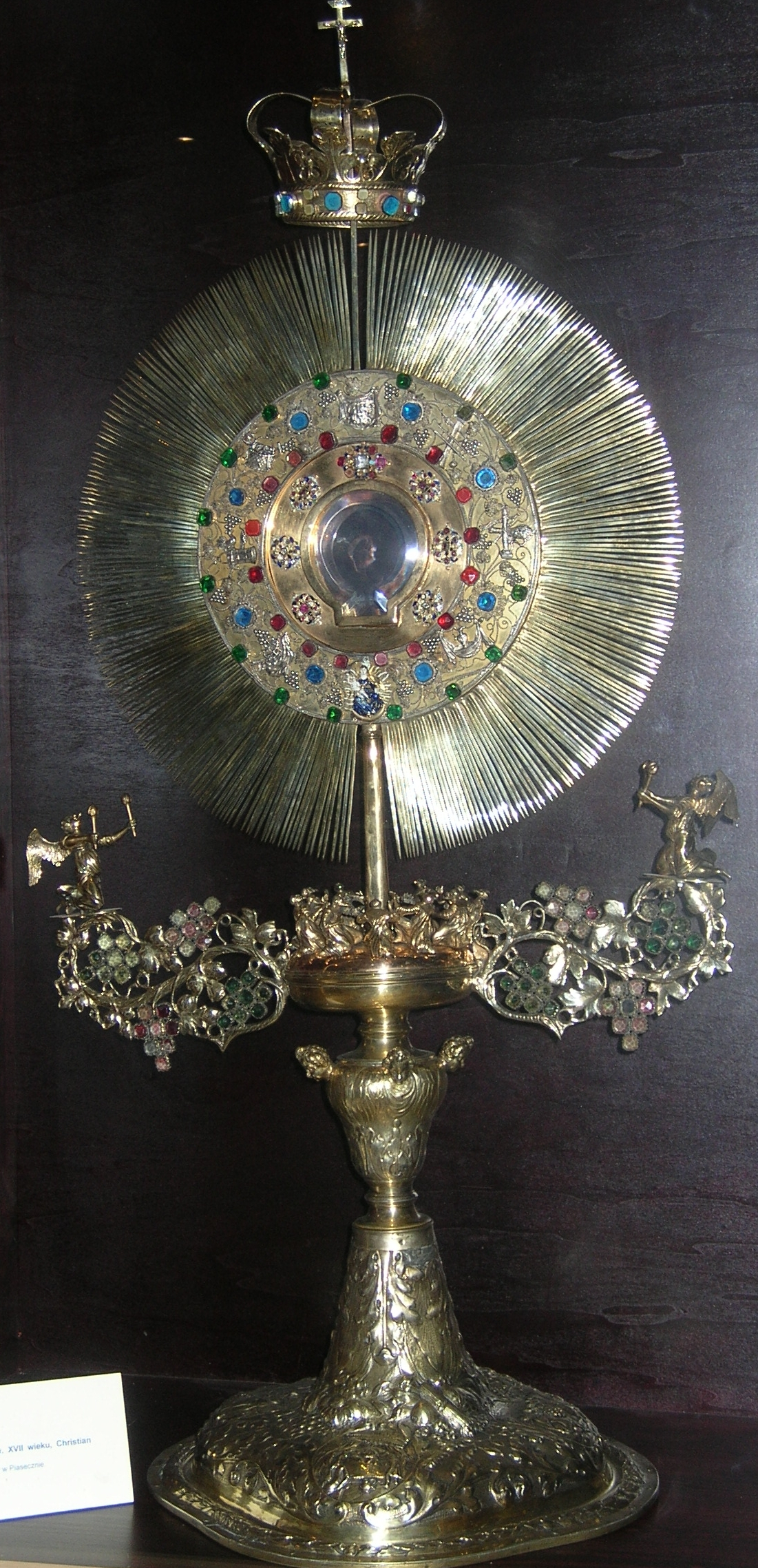
Monstrance from 17th c.

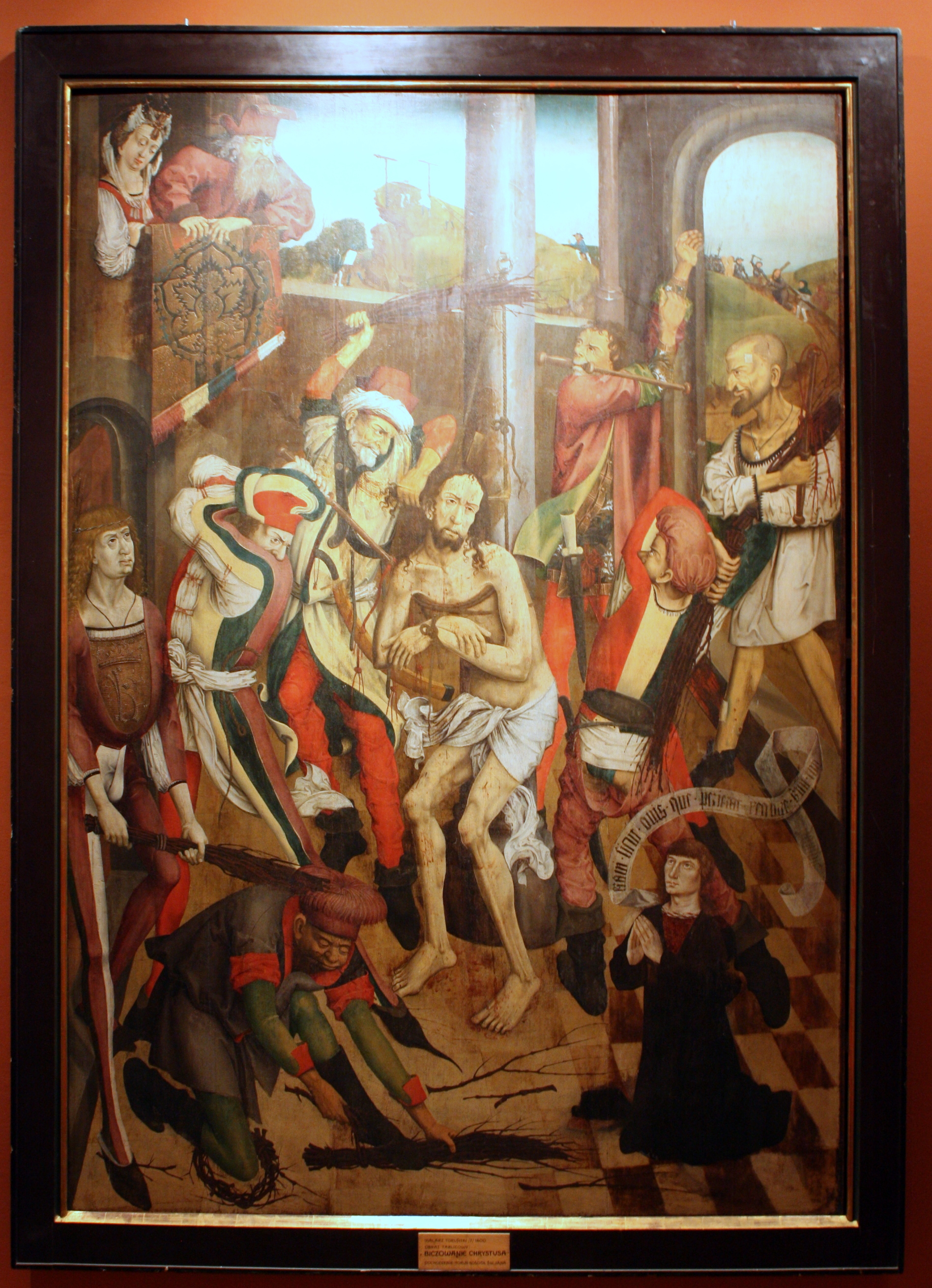

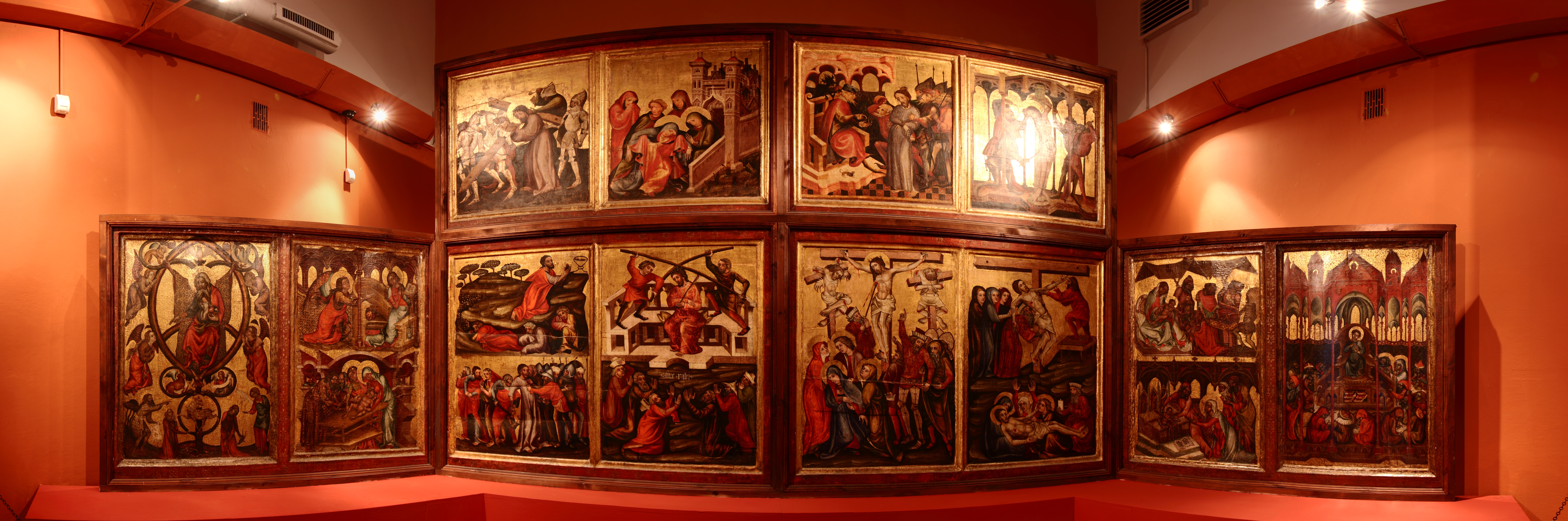
Toruń Polyptych, 14th c.

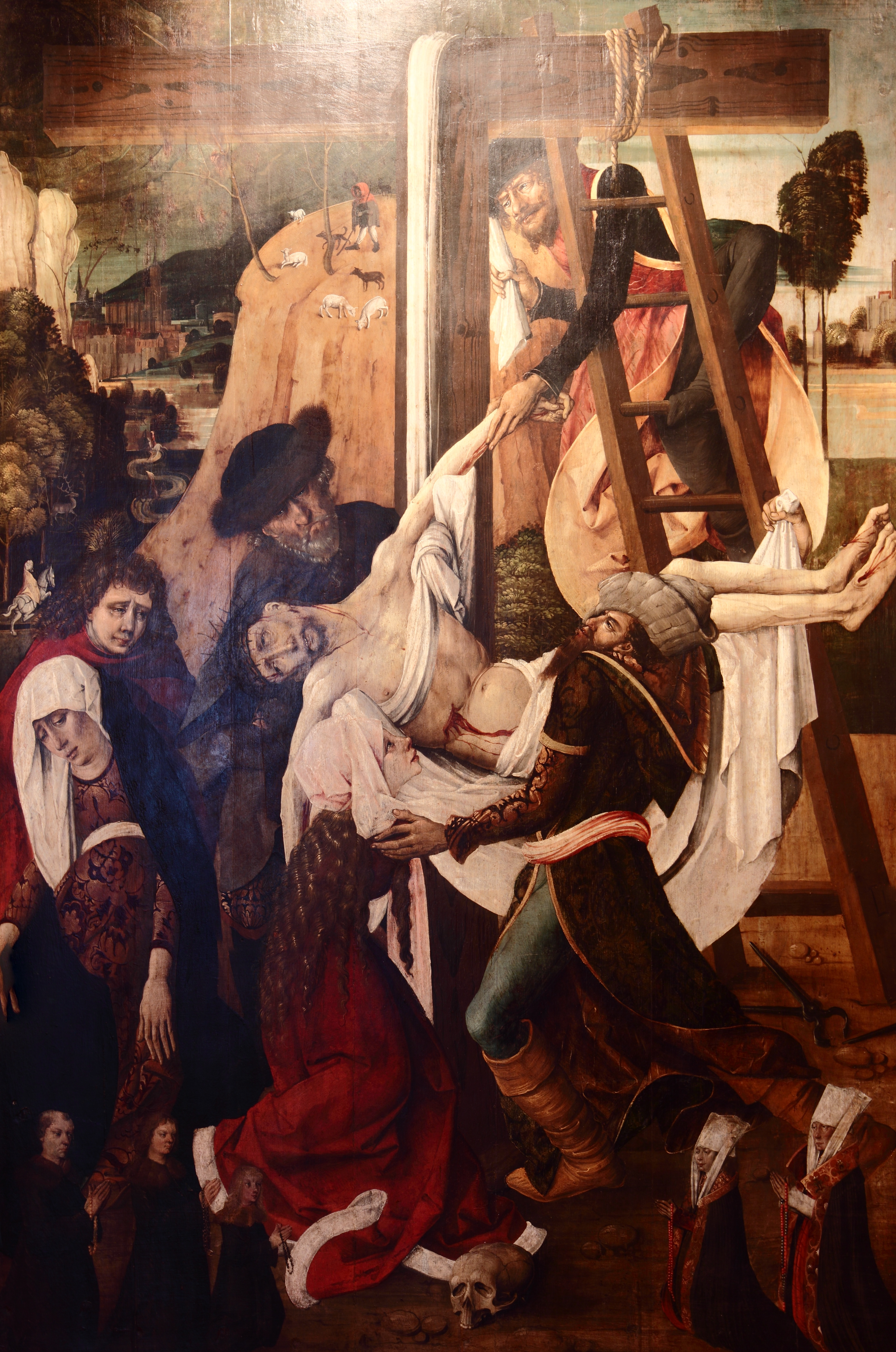
Descent from the Cross, late Gothic

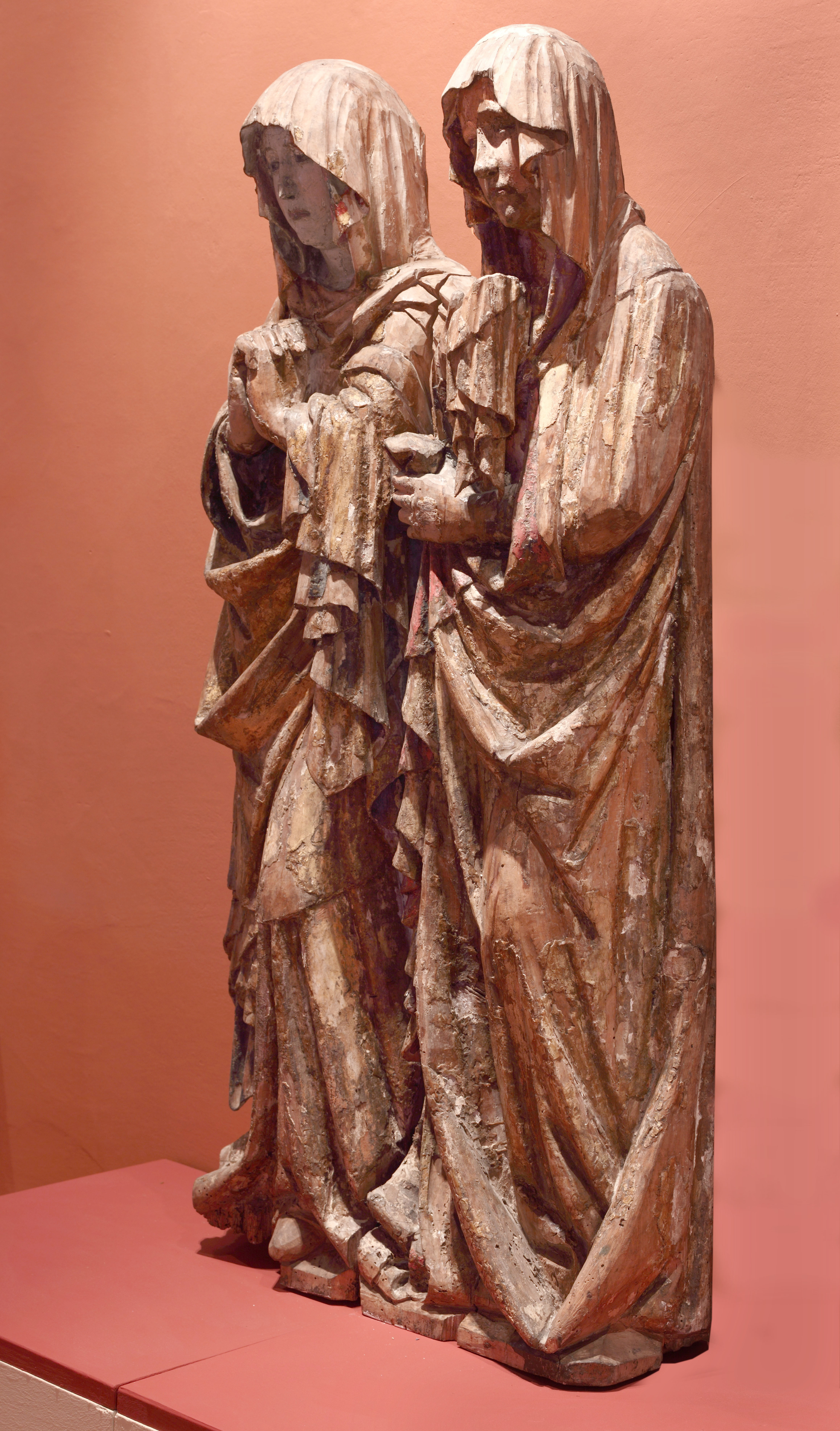
