= The Waking Hour =

Studio album by Dalis Car
- Released: November 1984
- Recorded: 1984
- Studio: The Manor, Air London, and Hernplace Studios
- Genre: Gothic rock
- Length: 35:06
- Label: Paradox
- Producer: Dalis Car; Steve Churchyard

Dalis Car chronology
The Waking Hour (1984)	InGladAloneness (2011)

The Waking Hour is the sole album by English band Dalis Car, a project of Peter Murphy of Bauhaus and Mick Karn of Japan. It was released in November 1984 by record label Paradox, which was created specifically to release the record (it was later reissued on Beggars Banquet).

== Content ==
The album's cover is a detail from the painting Daybreak by Maxfield Parrish, which was also utilized by The Moody Blues for the cover of The Present in 1983.

== Music video ==
A music video was released for the track "The Judgement Is the Mirror". The beginning of the video was filmed at the Ballycorus Leadmines in Dublin, the Għajn Tuffieħa Tower in Malta, and Fort St. Elmo (also in Malta). The video stars Murphy and Karn and was directed by Geoff Lowe.

== Reception ==
Professional ratings
Review scores
Source	Rating
AllMusic	3/5 stars

Trouser Press wrote: "As a mellifluous noise, The Waking Hour is fine, if a bit heavy on the bass; dig any deeper, however, and what you get is a hollow attempt to create art without any redeeming artistry."

Fact magazine included it in their list "20 best goth records ever made".

== Track listing ==
All tracks are written by Mick Karn and Peter Murphy, except as indicated.

No.	Title	Writer(s)	Length
1.	"Dalis Car"		5:12
2.	"His Box"		4:42
3.	"Cornwall Stone"		5:19
4.	"Artemis"	Mick Karn	4:37
5.	"Create and Melt"		5:36
6.	"Moonlife"	Traditional	4:56
7.	"The Judgement Is the Mirror"		4:40

== Personnel ==
Dalis Car

- Mick Karn – instrumentation (except percussion), production, design
- Peter Murphy – vocals, lyrics, production
- Paul Lawford – percussion, drum machines

Additional personnel

- Matt Butler – engineering and mixing
- Stuart Breed – mixing
- Steve Churchyard – production, mixing, engineering
- Fin Costello – album photography
- Rory Lonemore – engineering
- Maxfield Parrish – cover painting (detail from Daybreak)
- Sheila Rock – album photography
