= Thomas Bak =

German artist, writer and composer

- Citizenship: German
- Occupations: Visual artist, art director, writer

A Selection of Photographic Plates by Thomas Bak. The Photographic Capriccio. (1998–2008)

Thomas Tadeus Bak is a German visual artist, art director, writer and composer, mainly known for his work in photography.

== Biography ==
Bak was born on April 20, 1978, in Szczecin, Northern Poland. In 1981 his parents emigrated over Denmark to the Federal Republic of Germany and settled in Bremen in 1983. He was entitled as "Germany’s Youngest Draughtsman" at the age of eleven due to his first publication in a German graphic magazine for mature readers and elected twice as the "Official Graphic Designer of the Hochschule fuer Kuenste Bremen" during his studies of Book/Graphic Design and Photography at this university. Bak worked as an art director in European design studios and advertising agencies before he began to lecture the Photographic Master Class of the IAA (International Academy of Arts) at the age of twenty-seven in Germany, France and Poland. His works are featured in various releases for the music industry, including publications of former Bauhaus vocalist Peter Murphy and Dalis Car. He was the youngest photographer ever decorated with the Reinhart-Wolf-Preis and the BFF (Bund Freischaffender Foto-Designer) as the "Best of the Best" in 2004.

== Bibliography ==
=== Primary literature (books by Bak) ===
- Ene Mene Mysterium. Eine Sechspostkartennovelle. (1993)
- Den Hænden nach ein Hundt. (1995)
- AThMN. An Act of Tarot. (1995)
- Vropa. 22 Photographies. (1996)
- BVCH DER VVAND=LVNGEN & VVIRBEL=SÆVREN. Fynff=Zehn Blætter ihrer Længe nach betichtet. (1998)
- V.R.Op.A. : C I — IV. (1999)
- COSMONAVCIONES et Polaroïdes. (1999)
- Hand= bzw. Flusz=Abdrykke; Zwölf Absichten bald "Cosmonauciones" tätoliert. (2000)
- Atavista : 33 Photographic Compositions. (2000)
- Arche Nada; Yber dem Vm=Gang mit Todtem. Allsoh : "Gryner Fuchs" tætolirt. (2001)
- Vff=Tact zum Eiligen Kriege; Polaroïden & Tincturen. (Allrot, 2002)
- Fynff Tincturen. (Pan Press, 2002)
- The Tourist, Plates I — XXXV. (2006)
- Ex Ceterra Incognita, Capricci Erotici e Verticale. (2008)
- The Tourist, Plates XXXVI — LXXX. (2012)
- Ornament City, Essays & Capricci. (TK Verlag Hamburg, 2012)
- Psylens. (Pan Press / S.Ph.In.X. Camera Obscura International, 2013)
- On Love considered as one of the Fine Arts. Essays & Essails by Bak (TK Verlag Hamburg, 2014)
- Les Chants de Marlboror / AFFORISMEN IN SPE (Pan Press, 2015)

=== Secondary literature (selection) ===
- Inferso. KUBO Art Award 2000, Xzeit Edition Berlin (ISBN 3980755509)
- Manfred Schmalriede, Norbert Waning: Reinhart-Wolf-Preis 2004
- Bund freischaffender Fotodesigner: Das BFF-Jahrbuch 2005 (ISBN 3933989256)
- Peter Rautmann, Jörn Christiansen: Vier Jahrzehnte Fotografie in Bremen. Focke-Museum, 2003 (ISBN 3897571609)
- Ein tierisches Vergnuegen. Kunstsammlung der Sparkasse Bremen / Edition Hachmann, 2006 (ISBN 9783939429234)
- ATAVISTA. L'Œuvre Photographique du Thomas Bak. 2006 (Cannes, France)
- Gemeinsam, aber getrennt. 2008 (Gesellschaft "Forum e.V." zur Foerderung der Polnischen Kultur, Ministry of Culture and Communication Germany)
- BAK = ATAVISTA. The Photographic Works of Thomas Tadeus Bak. Second Edition, 2008 (IAA Publications, St.Magnus)
- Bak — The Photographic Capriccio. Sheets from 1998 to 2008 (Galerie Hilaneh von Kories / Photoselection GmbH)
- TAZ / Die Tageszeitung, 1990 (newspaper interview in German)
- Profifoto #2, 2005 (interview in German, 8 pages)
- Zoo Magazine #20, edited by Bryan Adams. 2008 (interview & retrospective in English, 8 pages)
- Profifoto #10, 2008 (retrospective in German, 6 pages)
- Schwarzweiss #87, Das Magazin fuer Fotografie. 2012 (retrospective 2008 — 2012 in German, 8 pages)
- Alambic Parisienne #2, 2013 (interview in French; featuring current works, 8 pages)

== Exhibition history (selection) ==
- 1999 "Three Positions of Contemporary Photography" at the Profile Intermedia 02, Congress Center Bremen, Germany
- "AThMN," Media Center Bremen
- 2000 "Inferso," Municipal Gallery (Bremen) & "Inferso," Kulturbrauerei GmbH (Berlin, Germany)
- 2001 "Paradogs," Profile Intermedia 04 (Bremen)
- 2002 "Four Decades of Photography in Bremen," Museum for the State's History
- 2004 "A=N," photokina (Cologne, Germany)
- "A=N," Design Center (Stuttgart, Germany)
- "AThMN/Metamorphoses," Institut Français & Goethe-Institut Budapest (Hungary)
- 2005 "V.R.Op.A." at the headquarters of the Tokyo Journal (Japan)
- Gallery B (Nagoya, Japan)
- 2006 "Ein tierisches Vergnügen," Sparkasse Bremen
- Retrospective "Atavista" at the gallery Marc Piano (Cannes, France)
- Retrospective "Atavista" at the International Academy of Arts (Lesmona, Germany)
- 2008 Retrospective "Das Photographische Capriccio. Blätter aus den Jahren 1998 bis 2008" at Galerie Hilaneh von Kories / Photoselection GmbH (Hamburg, Germany)

== Movies ==
- 1993: Incubus (22 min.)
- 1999: Χάλκανθον ~ SECRET FIGVRES VVRITTEN ON VVATER (8 min.)
- 2005: Atavista (40 min.)
- 2008: Edgar Alien Poe (28 min.)
- 2012: Rainbows On Fire (4 min.)
- 2013: L’OVE is the LAVVN / Love is the Lawn, MMXIII (6 min.)
