= Pieter Snapper =

Pieter Snapper (born 1967 in Berkeley, California) is a mastering engineer, producer, and composer of contemporary classical and electronic music, living in Istanbul, Turkey. His works have been played in the U.S., Europe, and Asia by groups such as KammarensembleN in Stockholm, and Klangforum in Vienna. He has received awards from BMI, ASCAP, UC Berkeley, the Union League Foundation, and commissions from the Fromm Foundation at Harvard University, Yamaha Corporation of America, the ensemble Eighth Blackbird, and the Memphis Symphony Orchestra.

His principal composition teachers included Andrew Imbrie and Edwin Dugger at the University of California, Berkeley, and Ralph Shapey and Howard Sandroff at the University of Chicago. In addition to composing, he has performed and toured extensively as a player of live and interactive computer music. His music is available on the Gasparo record label.

After teaching composition and electronic music at the Oberlin College Conservatory of Music, in 1999 Snapper moved to Istanbul to establish the composition and sound engineering programs at the Istanbul Technical University Center for Advanced Studies in Music (MIAM - Müzik Ileri Arastirmalar Merkezi). He also founded and developed the MIAM Studios in Turkey. In 2003 he co-organized an international conference at ITU on spectral music, the first of its kind, culminating in an edited volume with two audio CDs, published in 2008.

Working with digital art collective NOMAD, Snapper helped to organize ctrl_alt_del, the first international sound art festival in Turkey, held in 2003 and 2005. In 2004 =e appeared as a musical judge on the Turkish television series Akademi Türkiye. In 2006 he launched Soqrmom, a club-oriented intermedia music project incorporating live music and video, performed solo and in collaboration with Reuben de Lautour. He has also written for and collaborated with his sister, vocal artist Juliana Snapper, including sound design/live processing for the European premier of her underwater operatic performance "Five Fathoms Deep My Father Lies," at the Aksioma Center for Contemporary Art in Ljubljana, Slovenia in June, 2008. Later that year he premiered "insan/damat", his first work directly integrating Turkish musical elements, at the Kreutzstanbul II festival in Berlin.

In 2009 he co-founded Babajim Istanbul Studios & Mastering, a recording, mixing and mastering facility designed by studio architect Roger D'Arcy that opened in April 2010. He has recorded several hundred of albums in musical styles from pop, rock, arabesque, experimental, jazz, metal, hip-hop and classical. Among his clients are Turkish and international artists, including Stewart Copeland, Smadj, Lyric Opera of Chicago, Talvin Singh, the National Symphony Orchestra of Ireland, and Erik Truffaz.

== Selected compositions ==
- Chamber Symphony (1989)
- Planes of Lamentation and Light (Violin Solo, 1990)
- Diatribes (Flute Solo, 1991)
- Rapture (Piano, 1991)
- Dans l'oblique du froid (Soprano and piano, 1992)
- Sburator (Mandolin and Tape, 1992)
- Veins of Aether (Soprano, electronics, chamber orchestra, 1995)
- how we fall... (vln, vc, fl, cl, pno, 1996)
- The Madeleine in the Mercury (Clarinet and Live Electronics, 1998)
- Lament for a Lost Diva (String quartet, 1999)
- Eulogy for Verna Van Solkema (Tape, 1999)
- Zil (orchestra and live electronics, 1999)
- Malifornia (stereo soundtracks, 2001)
- Gradus ad Parnassum (surround soundtracks, 2003)
- Wrong (stereo soundtracks, 2003)
- Hyperv (stereo soundtracks, 2005)
- Whisky Tango (as Soqrmom, live electronics, 2006)
- Diva Tango (as Soqrmom, live electronics, 2007)
- No, you can't have a pony (as Soqrmom, live electronics, 2007)
- Mutate (as Soqrmom, live electronics, 2007)
- Ape-Listening Monkey (live electronics, 2008)
- Bone to Breeze Continuum (live electronics, 2008)
- insan/damat (live electronics, 2008)
- Forgetting (for Necil Kazim Akses, live electronics, 2009)
