= Japan (disambiguation) =

Japan is an archipelagic country in East Asia, located in the Northwestern Pacific Ocean.

Japan may also refer to:

== Places ==
- Empire of Japan, former political government of Japan (1868–1947)
- Japanese archipelago, referring to the geographic region of Japan
- Japan, Montenegro
- Japan, Missouri, an unincorporated community in the United States

== Lacquerware ==
- Japanese lacquerware or japan, a broad category of fine and decorative arts
- Japan black or japan, a lacquer or varnish used on iron and steel
- Japanning, European imitation of Asian lacquerwork
- Pontypool japan, the process of japanning with the use of an oil varnish and heat

== Literature ==
- Japan (1992 manga), a 1992 manga with art by Kentarou Miura
- Japan (1994 manga), a 1994 manga by Eiji Ōtsuka

== Film ==
- Japan (2008 film), an independent film starring Shane Brolly and Peter Fonda
- Japan (1960 film), a short film; see List of Disney live-action shorts
- Japan (2023 film), an Indian film written and directed by Raju Murugan
- Japón, a 2002 film by Mexican director Carlos Reygadas

== Music ==
=== Bands ===
- Japan (band), a British new wave and art rock band

=== Albums ===
- Japan (Japan album), a 1982 compilation album by Japan
- Japan (Tsuyoshi Nagabuchi album), a 1991 album, see Tsuyoshi Nagabuchi discography

=== Songs ===
- "Japan", a song by Be-Bop Deluxe, 1977
- "Japan", a song by Abwärts, 1979
- "Japan", a song by Landscape, 1979
- "Japan", a song by Amanda Lear, 1980
- "Japan", a song by Kenny G, 1985
- "Japan", a song by Scarlett and Black, 1987
- "Japan", a song by The Lonely Island, 2011
- "Japan", a song by Rex Orange County from Bcos U Will Never B Free, 2015
- "Japan", a song by Tired Lion from Dumb Days, 2017
- "Japan", by Famous Dex, 2018
- "Japan", by Fontaines D.C., 2026

== Other uses ==
- Japan (horse) (born 2016), Thoroughbred racehorse
- Japan (fig), a common fig cultivar

== See also ==
- Japanese (disambiguation)
- Japon (disambiguation)
- Nihon (disambiguation)
- Nippon (disambiguation)
- JPN (disambiguation)
- Jap (disambiguation)
