= Nihon (disambiguation) =

Nihon is a formal way of pronouncing the native name of Japan (日本).

Nihon may also refer to:

== People ==
- Alexis Nihon (1902–1980), Belgian-born Canadian inventor and businessman
- Alexis Nihon Jr. (1946–2013), Bahamian sport wrestler
- Robert Nihon (1950–2007), Canadian businessman

== Other ==
- Nihon University, a private, higher education institution in Japan

== See also ==
- Nippon (disambiguation)
- Japan (disambiguation)
- Japon (disambiguation)
- Nihonium
