= Ethnic Japanese =

Ethnic Japanese may refer to:

- Japanese people, people who are associated with Japan
  - Yamato people, the dominant native ethnic group of Japan
  - Ainu people, an indigenous people in Japan and Russia
  - Ryukyuan people, indigenous peoples of the Ryukyu Islands between the islands of Kyushu and Taiwan
- Japanese diaspora, emigrants from Japan and their descendants that reside in a foreign country
  - Ryukyuan diaspora, emigrants of Ryukyuan ethnicity and their descendants who reside outside of the Ryukyu Islands

== See also ==
- Ethnic issues in Japan
- Demographics of Japan
- Foreign-born Japanese
- Japanese (disambiguation)
- Japan (disambiguation)
