= Trichiurus japonicus =

Scientific classification
- Kingdom: Animalia
- Phylum: Chordata
- Class: Actinopterygii
- Division: Teleostei
- Order: Scombriformes
- Family: Trichiuridae
- Genus: Trichiurus
- Species: T. japonicus

Binomial name
- Trichiurus japonicus Temminck & Schlegel, 1844

Synonyms
- Trichiurus lepturus japonicus Temminck & Schlegel, 1844; Clupea haumela Fabricius, 1775; Trichiurus haumela (Fabricius, 1775)

Species of fish

Trichiurus japonicus, the Japanese cutlassfish, white ribbonfish or slender ribbonfish, is a species of cutlassfish in the genus Trichiurus, family Trichiuridae, order Scombriformes, superorder Percomorpha. It is distributed in the northwestern Pacific Ocean and inhabits subtropical offshore benthopelagic waters. The species has a long, ribbon-like body, reaches a relatively large size, and is an important commercial fish commonly harvested throughout its range. It was long treated as a subspecies or synonym of the largehead hairtail (Trichiurus lepturus).

== Nomenclature ==
This fish was first named in 1844 by the Dutch zoologist Coenraad Jacob Temminck and the German zoologist Hermann Schlegel. They regarded it as a subspecies of the largehead hairtail (Trichiurus lepturus) and therefore assigned it the name Trichiurus lepturus japonicus.

The specific epithet japonicus is Latin for “Japanese” or “of Japan,” referring to the fact that the type specimen originated from Japan.

== Taxonomy ==
The taxonomic status of this fish remained uncertain for a long time. It was variously treated as a subspecies or a synonym of the Trichiurus lepturus until 2022, when mitochondrial DNA analyses demonstrated that it is distinct from T. lepturus.

The East China Sea population that had been referred to as the T. haumela (East China Sea cutlassfish) is now regarded as a synonym of T. japonicus.

In addition, This species is the sister species of the Indian Ocean cutlassfish Trichiurus auriga (Pearly hairtail).

== Distribution ==
This species is distributed in the northwestern Pacific Ocean, including the waters of Japan, China, Taiwan, and Sakhalin Island in Russia. It is a subtropical fish species.

== Description ==
This species has an elongated body and is considered a large fish, reaching a maximum recorded length of 213 cm. The oldest recorded individual was 15 years old.

== Ecology ==
This species is a benthopelagic marine fish. Its ecology and behavior remain poorly known, but they are presumed to be similar to those of the largehead hairtail (Trichiurus lepturus).

== Economic importance ==
Because this species was long treated as a subspecies of, or confused with, the largehead hairtail, its catch records and fishery statistics are not clearly documented.

== Conservation status ==
As recently as the 2013 assessment of the largehead hairtail, this species was still regarded by the International Union for Conservation of Nature (IUCN) as a synonym of Trichiurus lepturus. Consequently, it has not yet been assessed independently for its conservation status.
