= Japan (Japan album) =

Compilation album by Japan
- Released: 1 March 1982
- Recorded: 1980–1981
- Genres: Art pop; synth-pop; new wave
- Length: 43:16
- Label: Epic
- Producers: Japan; John Punter

Japan chronology
Tin Drum (1981)	Japan (1982)	Oil On Canvas (1983)

Japan is an album by the British band Japan, released in the United States in March 1982 on the Epic Records label. It was the first US release of the band's material recorded for Virgin Records in the UK (Obscure Alternatives, on Ariola Records, had already been released in the US), and was a combination of most of Tin Drum with three tracks from Gentlemen Take Polaroids. It was released at a time when the band was beginning to break up. Despite the group's popularity in Europe and Asia, and a cult following in the US, the album did not break into the Billboard 200 chart. However, it did peak at number 204 on the Bubbling Under the Top LPs chart.

== Reception ==
The album was reviewed in Billboard: "Coming in with its own version of stylish rock years ahead of Soft Cell, Human League, etc. yet behind Bowie and Roxy Music, Japan has gotten lost in the cracks. This album, though derivative, shows what Americans have been missing. This is well-played dance music which is also thought provoking because of its Far Eastern feel."

Reviewing for Musician, J. D. Considine wrote, "Instead of the cool, glassy textures and rigid rhythmic structure of most synth-rock, Japan has achieved a soft, almost organic sound reminiscent of Brian Eno's Another Green World or Before And After Science. At its worst, this is just high-tech atmosphere music with David Sylvian's dark, Bryan Ferry-ish crooning adding just the right touch of melancholy. Mostly, though, Japan's deft mixture of synthetics, ethnic touches (like the African drums on "Talking Islands In Africa" or the dida on "Visions Of China") and unconventional dance rhythms makes for compelling listening."

== Track listing ==
All tracks are written by David Sylvian, except where noted.

Side one
No.	Title	Length
1.	"The Art of Parties"	4:15
2.	"Talking Drum"	3:30
3.	"Ghosts" (alternate edit)	4:18
4.	"Gentlemen Take Polaroids"	7:02

Side two
No.	Title	Writer(s)	Length
5.	"Still Life in Mobile Homes"		5:30
6.	"Visions of China"	Steve Jansen, Sylvian	3:36
7.	"Taking Islands in Africa" (Steve Nye remix)	Ryuichi Sakamoto, Sylvian	4:51
8.	"Swing"		6:18
9.	"Cantonese Boy"		3:46
Total length:			43:16

== Personnel ==
Musicians

- Richard Barbieri – keyboard instruments, programming, tape, synthetic bass track B3
- Steve Jansen – drums, percussion instruments, electronic percussion, keyboards (percussion), keyboards track B3
- Mick Karn – fretless bass, African flute, dida, African drum track B3, percussion track B3
- David Sylvian – guitar, keyboard instruments, programming, tape, vocals, additional keyboards track B3
- Simon House – violin
- Yuka Fujii – vocals
- Ryuichi Sakamoto – keyboards track B3

Technical

- Japan – producers tracks: A1 to A3, B1 to B2, B5, remix track B3
- John Punter – producer, engineer tracks A4 & B4
- Steve Nye – engineer tracks: A1 to A3, B1 to B3, B5, remix track B3
- Renate Blauel – assistant engineer
- Colin Fairley – engineer tracks A4 & B4
- Nigel Walker – engineer tracks A4 & B4
- Steve Prestage – engineer tracks A4 & B4
- John Berg – artwork, design
- Fin Costello – photography
- Mastered at Columbia NY

== Charts ==
Chart (1982)	Peak position
US Bubbling Under the Top LPs (Billboard)	204
US Cash Box Top 200 Albums	157
US Record World 200 Albums	184
