= Nippo =

Nippo may refer to:

== Companies and organizations ==
- Nippo, colloquial name for Nihon Ken Hozonkai (日本犬保存会, The Association for the Preservation of the Japanese Dog)
- Nippo Batteries, an Indian battery manufacturer
- Nippo Corporation, a Japanese construction company and sponsor of cycling teams
  - EF Education–Nippo, a cycling team that competed during 2021
  - Nippo–Provence–PTS Conti, a cycling team formed in November 2020
  - Nippo–Vini Fantini–Faizanè, a cycling team that competed from 2008 to 2019

== Places ==
- Nippō Kaigan Quasi-National Park, in Japan
- Nippo Pond, a body of water in Barrington, New Hampshire

== Other ==
- Nippo, a Japanese male villain in the Shazam family of comic book characters during the 1940s and 1950s
- Nippo Jisho, a Japanese to Portuguese dictionary of the 17th century
- Nippō Main Line, a railway line in southern Japan

== See also ==
- Nippon (disambiguation)
