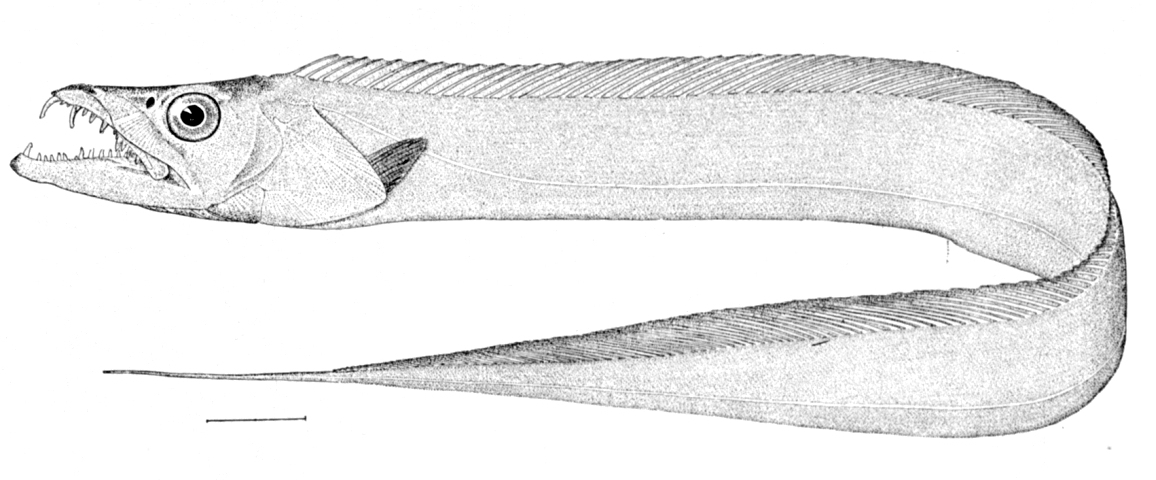
- Trichiurus lepturus

Scientific classification
- Kingdom: Animalia
- Phylum: Chordata
- Class: Actinopterygii
- Division: Teleostei
- Order: Scombriformes
- Family: Trichiuridae
- Subfamily: Trichiurinae
- Genus: Trichiurus; Linnaeus, 1758

Type species
- Trichiurus lepturus Linnaeus 1758.

= Trichiurus =

Trichiurus Temporal range: Eocene - Recent

Genus of ray-finned fishes

Trichiurus is a genus of cutlassfishes belonging to the family Trichiuridae.

== Species ==
Species within this genus include:

- Trichiurus auriga, Klunzinger, 1884 (Pearly hairtail)
- Trichiurus australis Chakraborty, Burhanuddin & Iwatsuki, 2005
- Trichiurus brevis, Wang & You, 1992 (Chinese short-tailed hairtail)
- Trichiurus gangeticus, Gupta, 1966 (Ganges hairtail)
- Trichiurus japonicus, Temminck & Schlegel, 1844 (Japanese cutlassfish)
- Trichiurus lepturus, Linnaeus, 1758 (Largehead hairtail)
- Trichiurus margarites, Li, 1992
- Trichiurus nanhaiensis, Wang & Xu, 1992
- Trichiurus nickolensis, Burhanuddin & Iwatsuki, 2003 (Australian short-tailed hairtail)
- Trichiurus nitens, Garman, 1899
- Trichiurus russelli, Dutt & Thankam, 1966 (Short-tailed hairtail)

== Extinct species ==
Extinct species within this genus include:

- †Trichiurus miocaenus Delfortrie, 1876
- †Trichiurus oshoshunensis White, 1926
- †Trichiurus plicidens Arambourg, 1952

Extinct species lived from the Eocene epoch to the Quaternary period, approximately from 48.6 to 0.012 million years ago. Fossils have been found in the Eocene sediments of Antarctica, Nigeria, United Kingdom, United States, in the Miocene of Costa Rica, India, Mexico, Panama, Slovakia and in the Quaternary of United States.
