= Nippon (disambiguation) =

Nippon is a formal way of pronouncing the native name of Japan (日本).

Nippon may also refer to:

- "Nippon" (song), a 2014 single by Ringo Sheena
- Nippon (aircraft), a converted Mitsubishi G3M2 Model 21 used to make a round-the-world flight in 1939
- Nippon (Warhammer), a location in the World of Warhammer, fantasy role-playing game
- Nippon Paint, Japanese paint manufacturer

== See also ==
- Names of Japan, for further comparison of Nippon, Nihon, and other names of the country
- Nihon (disambiguation)
- Japan (disambiguation)
- Japon (disambiguation)
