= Alexis Nihon =

Belgian-born Canadian inventor and businessman

Alexis Louis Nihon
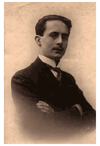
- Nihon in 1930
- Born: Alexis Louis Nihon; 15 May 1902; Liège, Belgium
- Died: 8 April 1980 (aged 77); Nassau, Bahamas
- Occupation(s): Inventor and Businessman
- Spouse: Alice Robert Nihon
- Children: 4, including Alexis Nihon Jr. and Robert Nihon
- Parent(s): Alexis Laurent Nihon; Marie Florentine Thiry

Alexis Louis Nihon, OBE (15 May 1902 – 8 April 1980) was a Belgian-born Canadian inventor and businessman.

== Biography ==
Alexis was born in Liège, Belgium, the son of Alexis Laurent Nihon and Marie Florentine Thiry, he moved to Canada when he was eighteen years old.

In 1940, he started the glass manufacturer Compagnie industrielle du verre limitée (Industrial Glass Works Company Limited) in Saint-Laurent, Quebec; it was one of the few Canadian glass manufacturers during the Second World War. He sold it in the 1940s. In 1946, he started Corporation Alexis Nihon (today Alexis Nihon REIT) that would later become one of the largest real estate companies in Canada.

He was married to Alice Robert Nihon and they had four children: two daughters who died young, and Olympic wrestlers Alexis Nihon Jr. and Robert Nihon. He died at his home in Nassau, Bahamas in 1980.

In addition to the REIT (Real Estate Investment Trust), his name lives on as a major residential/commercial thoroughfare, Alexis Nihon Boulevard, and Alexis-Nihon Park, both in Saint-Laurent, and the Place Alexis Nihon shopping mall in downtown Montreal. It was built on one of his several tracts of land that he rented to developers.
