= Japan, Montenegro =

Japan Јапан
- Village
- Location within Montenegro
- Coordinates: 42.68°N 19.71°E
- Country: Montenegro
- Municipality: Andrijevica
- Time zone: UTC+1 (CET)
  - Summer (DST): UTC+2 (CEST)
- Postal code: 84320

Japan (Cyrillic: Јапан) is a hamlet in the municipality of Andrijevica, Montenegro. The village is roughly 6 km away from the border of Albania.

The name of the village is often disputed; one source bases it on a legend from the time of the Kingdom of Montenegro, where a village wiseman and flag-bearer (barjaktar) by the name of Samilo Fatić was a prominent fighter in the war against the Austro-Hungarian Empire during World War I. Afterwards, on a ceremony where he was awarded with a medal from King Nikola I, the King himself asked him of his aspirations, and he responded that his greatest wish "would be to bring water to the village from the source of Biruljak". When the King asked him of the location of this village, he responded with "far away in the unseen, far away as Japan."

Due to the increasingly difficult conditions during the winter, some of the inhabitants have chosen to leave the village and settle elsewhere, given the village is located at the foothills of Mount Komovi, which is now a protected national park since 2018.

The village came to the attention of the Japanese, which was visited by some Japanese journalists, who except in an unusual name, were convinced and with what natural beauties Montenegro has at its disposal.
