= Cantonese Boy =

1982 single by Japan

Single by Japan

from the album Tin Drum
- B-side: "Burning Bridges" (7")
- Released: 14 May 1982
- Recorded: August 1981
- Studio: Odyssey (London, UK)
- Genre: Art pop; new wave; synthpop
- Length: 3:44
- Label: Virgin
- Songwriter: David Sylvian
- Producers: Steve Nye; Japan

Japan singles chronology
"Ghosts" (1982)	"Cantonese Boy" (1982)	"I Second That Emotion" (1982)

"Cantonese Boy" is a song by English new wave band Japan, released in May 1982 as the fourth and final single from their 1981 album Tin Drum. The single peaked at number 24 on the UK Singles Chart. The song refers to the enlistment of a Cantonese boy to the Chinese Red Army.

== Release ==
"Cantonese Boy" was released with the B-side "Burning Bridges" on the 7-inch single, taken from the band's previous album Gentlemen Take Polaroids. The 12-inch single two different B-sides: "The Experience of Swimming" and "Gentlemen Take Polaroids", which were originally released on the "Gentlemen Take Polaroids" single in October 1980. A double 7-inch single was also released: the 7-inch single of "Cantonese Boy" and the two 12-inch B-sides, switched around, making it exactly the same as the "Gentlemen Take Polaroids" single.

== Reception ==
Reviewing the song for Record Mirror, Sunie Fletcher described it as "a skillful, fluent and textured piece of music" and that as a single "it's a less obvious proposition than its predecessors, "Ghosts" and "Visions of China"", as "its chief shortcoming is the lack of a hook, as they say in the trade, but it's pleasurable listening for all that". Dave Rimmer for Smash Hits wrote that it is "a good song", but "can't really be counted as much more than a stop-gap measure until the boys in rouge re-unite and pen something new".

== Track listings ==
7": Virgin / VS 502 (UK)

1. "Cantonese Boy" – 3:44
2. "Burning Bridges" – 5:20

Double 7": Virgin / VS 502 (UK)

1. "Cantonese Boy" – 3:44
2. "Burning Bridges" – 5:20
3. "Gentlemen Take Polaroids" – 3:28
4. "The Experience of Swimming" – 4:02

12": Virgin / VS 502-12 (UK)

1. "Cantonese Boy" – 3:44
2. "The Experience of Swimming" – 4:02
3. "Gentlemen Take Polaroids" – 7:06

== Personnel ==
Japan

- David Sylvian – vocals, keyboards, tapes
- Richard Barbieri – keyboards, tapes
- Mick Karn – bass guitar
- Steve Jansen – drums, percussion

Technical

- Steve Nye – engineer, mixing, producer
- Phil Bodger – assistant engineer
- David Sylvian – cover design
- Steve Jansen – cover photography
- Allan Ballard – photography of Japan
- Ken Ansell – lettering

== Charts ==
Chart (1982)	Peak position
Ireland (IRMA)	20
UK Singles (OCC)	24
