= Tsuyoshi Nagabuchi discography =

The discography of Japanese singer-songwriter Tsuyoshi Nagabuchi consists of 24 studio albums, 6 live albums, 14 compilation albums, and 57 singles.

== Albums ==
=== Studio albums ===
Title	Album details	Peak chart positions
Title	Album details	JPN
Kaze Wa Minami Kara (風は南から)	Released: March 5, 1979; Label: Toshiba-EMI	16
Gyaku-ryu (逆流)	Released: November 5, 1979; Label: Toshiba-EMI	1
Kanpai (乾杯)	Released: September 5, 1980; Label: Toshiba-EMI	1
Bye Bye	Released: October 1, 1981; Label: Toshiba-EMI	2
Jidai Wa Bokura Ni Ame O Furashiteru (時代は僕らに雨を降らしてる)	Released: September 1, 1982; Label: Toshiba-EMI	3
Heavy Gauge	Released: June 21, 1983; Label: Toshiba-EMI	6
Hold Your Last Chance	Released: August 18, 1984; Label: Toshiba-EMI	3
Hungry	Released: August 22, 1985; Label: Toshiba-EMI	4
Stay Dream	Released: October 22, 1986; Label: Toshiba-EMI	3
License	Released: August 5, 1987; Label: Toshiba-EMI	1
Never Change	Released: March 5, 1988; Label: Toshiba-EMI	1
Showa (昭和)	Released: March 25, 1989; Label: Toshiba-EMI	1
Jeep	Released: August 25, 1990; Label: Toshiba-EMI	1
Japan	Released: December 14, 1991; Label: Toshiba-EMI	1
Captain of the Ship	Released: November 1, 1993; Label: Toshiba-EMI	1
Kazoku (家族)	Released: January 1, 1996; Label: Toshiba-EMI	3
Fuzaken-ja-ne (ふざけんじゃねぇ)	Released: September 3, 1997; Label: For Life Music Entertainment	1
Samurai	Released: October 14, 1998; Label: For Life Music Entertainment	1
Acoustic Ore-no Taiyo (Acoustic 俺の太陽)	Released: December 22, 1999; Label: For Life Music Entertainment	5
Sora (空)	Released: June 27, 2001; Label: For Life Music Entertainment	5
Keep On Fighting	Released: May 14, 2003; Label: For Life Music Entertainment	1
Come On Stand Up!	Released: May 16, 2007; Label: For Life Music Entertainment	4
Friends	Released: August 12, 2009; Label: Nayutawave Records	2
Try Again	Released: November 10, 2010; Label: Nayutawave Records	3
Stay Alive	Released: May 16, 2012; Label: Nayutawave Records	3
Black Train	Released: August 16, 2017; Label: Universal Music	2
Blood	Released: May 22, 2024; Label: Virgo & Leo Records	4

=== Live albums ===
Title	Album details	Peak chart positions
Title	Album details	JPN
Nagabuchi Tsuyoshi Live (長渕剛 Live)	Released: March 5, 1981; Label: Toshiba-EMI	4
Super Live in Seibu Stadium (Super Live in 西武球場)	Released: August 25, 1983; Label: Toshiba-EMI	13
Nagabuchi Tsuyoshi Live '89 (長渕剛 Live '89)	Released: February 21, 1990; Label: Toshiba-EMI	1
Live Complete '95-'96	Released: October 25, 1996; Label: Toshiba-EMI	4
Tsuyoshi Nagabuchi All Night Live in Sakurajima 04.8.21 (長渕剛 All Night Live in 桜島 04.8.21)	Released: November 20, 2004; Label: For Life Music Entertainment	10
Mt Fuji All Night Live 2015 (富士山麓 All Night Live 2015)	Released: February 3, 2016; Label: Universal Music	5

=== Compilation albums ===
Title	Album details	Peak chart positions
Title	Album details	JPN
Best Now Nagabuchi Tsuyoshi 1978~1981 (Best Now 長渕剛 1978年〜1981年)	Released: June 5, 1981; Label: Toshiba-EMI	—
From T.N.	Released: November 28, 1983; Label: Toshiba-EMI	4
Love Songs	Released: May 1, 1986; Label: Toshiba-EMI	8
Itsuka-no Shonen (いつかの少年)	Released: December 1, 1994; Label: Toshiba-EMI	2
Singles Vol. 1	Released: December 10, 1997; Label: Toshiba-EMI	24
Singles Vol. 2	Released: December 10, 1997; Label: Toshiba-EMI	20
Singles Vol. 3	Released: December 10, 1997; Label: Toshiba-EMI	28
Single Collection	Released: December 4, 1988; Label: Toshiba-EMI	10
Best～Kaze～ (Best～風～)	Released: June 26, 2002; Label: For Life Music Entertainment	5
Best～Sora～ (Best～空～)	Released: June 26, 2002; Label: For Life Music Entertainment	6
Yamato	Released: October 19, 2005; Label: For Life Music Entertainment	6
Love	Released: May 14, 2008; Label: For Life Music Entertainment	5
Songs	Released: May 21, 2008; Label: For Life Music Entertainment	4
Tsuyoshi Nagabuchi All Time Best 2014	Released: July 2, 2014; Label: EMI Records	4

== Singles ==
=== 1970s-1980s ===
Title	Year	Peak chart positions	Album
Title	Year	JPN	Album
"Ame No Arashiyama" (雨の嵐山)	1977	53	Non-album single
"Junrenka" (巡恋歌)	1978	173	Kaze Wa Minami Kara (風は南から)
"Oira No Uchi Made" (俺らの家まで)	1979	118	Kaze Wa Minami Kara (風は南から)
"Inori" (祈り)	1979	55	Gyaku-ryu (逆流)
"Harumachi Kiryu" (春待気流)	1980	33	Non-album single
"Junko / Namida No Serenade" (順子 / 涙のセレナーデ)	1980	1	Gyaku-ryu (逆流)
"Heroine" (ヒロイン)	1980	29	Kanpai (乾杯)
"Natsu No Koibito" (夏の恋人)	1981	20	Non-album single
"Futari Aruki" (二人歩記)	1981	55	Bye Bye
"Hanaichimonme" (花いちもんめ)	1982	55	Non-album single
"Koibito Jidai" (恋人時代)	1983	31	Non-album single
"Good-bye Seishun" (Good-bye青春)	1983	5	Non-album single
"Kodoku Na Heart" (孤独なハート)	1984	21	Hold Your Last Chance
"Hisashiburi Ni Ore Wa Naitanda" (久しぶりに俺は泣いたんだ)	1985	21	Hungry
"Yuji" (勇次)	1985	29	Hungry
"Super Star"	1986	13	Stay Dream
"Rokunamon Ja Ne" (ろくなもんじゃねえ)	1987	3	License
"Naite Chinpira" (泣いてチンピラ)	1987	9	License
"Kanpai" (乾杯)	1988	1	Never Change
"Never Change"	1988	2	Showa (昭和)
"Tonbo" (とんぼ)	1988	1	Showa (昭和)
"Geki Ai" (激愛)	1989	1	Showa (昭和)
"Shoppai Mikaduki No Yoru" (しょっぱい三日月の夜)	1989	1	Jeep

=== 1990s-2000s ===
Title	Year	Peak chart positions	Album
Title	Year	JPN	Album
"Jeep"	1990	2	Jeep
"Shabondama" (しゃぼん玉)	1991	1	Japan
"Junrenka" (巡恋歌)	1992	1	Non-album single
"Run"	1993	1	Captain of the Ship
"Ningen" (人間)	1994	4	Non-album single
"Tomo Yo" (友よ)	1995	2	Kazoku (家族)
"Kizu Mamire No Seishun" (傷まみれの青春)	1996	10	Kazoku (家族)
"Himawari" (ひまわり)	1997	5	Fuzaken-ja-ne (ふざけんじゃねぇ)
"Yubikiri Genman" (指切りげんまん)	1998	2	Samurai
"Saru Ippiki Utaeba Samurai" (猿一匹、唄えば侍)	1998	28	Samurai
"Namida No Serenade" (涙のセレナーデ)	1999	23	Acoustic Ore-no Taiyo (Acoustic 俺の太陽)
"Sora" (空)	2001	16	Sora (空)
"Shizuka Naru Afghan" (静かなるアフガン)	2002	12	Non-album single
"Shiawase Ni Narou Yo" (しあわせになろうよ)	2003	2	Keep on Fighting
"Kiniro No Lion" (金色のライオン)	2004	9	Non-album single
"Close Your Eyes / Yamato"	2005	4	Non-album single
"Taiyo-u No Fune" (太陽の船)	2006	3	Non-album single
"Sotsugyou" (卒業)	2009	4	Friends
"Semi" (蝉)	2009	8	Friends

=== 2010s-2020s ===
Title	Year	Peak chart positions	Album
Title	Year	JPN	Album
"Oretachino Niraikanai" (俺たちのニライカナイ)	2010	10	Try Again
"Kizuna" (絆)	2010	6	Try Again
"Try Again For Japan"	2011	12	Non-album single
"Hitotsu" (ひとつ)	2012	4	Stay Alive
"Mirai" (未来)	2013	15	Non-album single
"Hold Your Last Chance 2014"	2014	—	Non-album single
"Hashiru" (走る)	2014	15	Non-album single
"Ashitaetsuzukumichi" (明日へ続く道)	2014	—	Non-album single
"Fuji No Kuni" (富士の国)	2015	11	Non-album single
"Loser"	2017	—	Black Train
"Black Train"	2017	—	Black Train
"Don't Think Twice" (桜並木の面影にゆれて)	2018	—	Non-album single
"Amen"	2018	—	Non-album single
"Orange"	2020	25	Non-album single
"Shakunage Iro No Sora" (しゃくなげ色の空)	2020	—	Non-album single
"Reborn"	2022	—	Non-album single
