= Gentlemen Take Polaroids (song) =

1980 single by Japan

Single by Japan

from the album Gentlemen Take Polaroids
- B-side: "The Experience of Swimming"
- Released: 10 October 1980
- Genre: New wave
- Length: 3:28 (single version); 7:08 (album version)
- Label: Virgin
- Songwriter: David Sylvian
- Producer: John Punter

Japan singles chronology
"I Second That Emotion" (1980)	"Gentlemen Take Polaroids" (1980)	"The Art of Parties" (1981)

"Gentlemen Take Polaroids" is a song by English new wave band Japan, released as a single from the album of the same name in October 1980. It was the band's first charting single in the UK, peaking at number 60.

== Composition ==
The song started with a keyboard line by David Sylvian. Richard Barbieri added the keyboard melody, Steve Jansen the drums and Mick Karn plays oboe on the track. Sylvian composed the chorus and the vocal melody and wrote the lyrics. According to guitarist Rob Dean the band worked quite long on the song compared to the other tracks on the forthcoming album.

== Release and promotion ==
The single was Japan's first release on Virgin Records in October 1980 and their first entry on the UK Singles Chart at number 60. The B-side featured "The Experience of Swimming", an instrumental track composed by Richard Barbieri. A double single EP was also released including two exclusive tracks, "The Width of a Room", the only Japan track written by Rob Dean, and a version of "Burning Bridges" produced by David Sylvian. The cover featured a photo of David Sylvian and the gatefold doublepack showed a colour photo of the band when unfolded. A promotional music video for "Gentlemen Take Polaroids" was made, but it was never shown on British television at the time.

== Reception ==
The single was the band's first release under Virgin Records and, according to writer Martin Power, "established a clever music bridge between the refined groove of Quiet Life and the band's forthcoming LP".

It has been described as a "dynamic masterpiece alternating between the experimental, free-floating middle parts, and the casual pop chorus found throughout the song" and "both complex and catchy". However, reviewing the song for Record Mirror, Ronnie Gurr described the single as having an "awful title and mellifluously nondescript Roxy rip-off A-side. Elsewhere Eno's school of modern bland-out muzak that's so dull and nondescript, one can't ignore the fact the damn stuff takes hold".

Smash Hits reviewer Steve Taylor wrote: "'Polaroids' is one of their elegant retreads of mid-period Roxy Music — even down to the detail of using the same producer — and it's attractively smooth and syrupy. The sounds are generously ladled over an appropriately oriental sounding hook that isn't quite strong enough to close the credibility gap yet."

The song was popular with club DJs: Nick Rhodes regularly played it at the Rum Runner, and Rusty Egan played it at the Blitz.

== CD reissue ==
In 1988, Virgin reissued "Gentlemen Take Polaroids" as a 3-inch CD featuring the 7.06 minute album version coupled with "Cantonese Boy" from Tin Drum and "Methods of Dance" from Gentlemen Take Polaroids, housed in a miniature version of the Gentlemen Take Polaroids album sleeve.

== Track listings ==
7-inch: Virgin / VS 379 (UK)

1. "Gentlemen Take Polaroids" – 3:28
2. "The Experience of Swimming" – 4:04

7-inch: Virgin / 102 513 (Germany)

1. "Gentlemen Take Polaroids" – 3:28
2. "The Width of a Room" – 3:14

7-inch: Virgin / VIPX-1550 (Japan)

1. "Gentlemen Take Polaroids" – 3:28
2. "Burning Bridges" – 3:59

Double 7-inch EP: Virgin / VS 379 (UK)

1. "Gentlemen Take Polaroids" – 3:28
2. "The Experience of Swimming" – 4:04
3. "The Width of a Room" – 3:12
4. "Burning Bridges" – 3:59

Mini CD EP: Virgin / CDT 32 (UK, 1988)

1. "Gentlemen Take Polaroids" – 7:05
2. "Cantonese Boy" – 3:44
3. "Methods of Dance" – 6:53

== Personnel ==
Japan

- David Sylvian – vocals
- Richard Barbieri – synthesizers
- Mick Karn – fretless bass, saxophone, oboe
- Rob Dean – guitar
- Steve Jansen – drums

Technical

- Nigel Walker – engineer
- Steve Prestage – engineer
- Nicola Tyson – photography
- Steve Chivers – assisted photography

== Charts ==
Chart (1980)	Peak position
UK Singles (Official Charts)	60
