= JPN (disambiguation) =

JPN is the ISO 3166-1 alpha-3 and UNDP country code for Japan.

JPN may also refer to:

- jpn, ISO 639-2 and ISO 639-3 code for Japanese language
- JPN (album), a 2011 album by Perfume
- Toyota JPN Taxi, a hatchback car by Toyota Motor Corporation used as a taxi in Japan and other countries in East Asia
- Pentagon Army Heliport in Arlington County, Virginia (FAA location identifier JPN)
