= Alexis Nihon Jr. =

Bahamian wrestler

Alexis Joseph Nihon Jr. (January 10, 1946 – February 24, 2013) was an Olympic wrestler for the Bahamas. He was the son of Canadian businessman Alexis Louis Nihon.

Born in Montreal, Quebec, Canada, he competed at the 1968 Summer Olympics. His brother Robert Nihon, who was also a wrestler also competed at the same Olympics.
