= Robert Nihon =

Canadian businessman and wrestler

- Born: Robert Alexis Nihon; July 4, 1950; Montreal, Quebec, Canada
- Died: August 10, 2007 (aged 57); Dorval, Quebec, Canada
- Occupations: Businessman; Wrestler
- Children: Robert Nihon & Gregory Nihon
- Parent(s): Alexis Nihon & Alice Robert Nihon

Robert Alexis Nihon (July 4, 1950 – August 10, 2007) was a Canadian businessman, one of the heirs of the Nihon family fortune and former wrestler. He was Alexis Nihon's son along with his brother Alexis Nihon Jr., and eventually inherited a part of his father's fortune. Robert Nihon lived in Lyford Cay, Bahamas where he was known to spend time on his yacht.

He also competed at the 1968 Summer Olympics in Mexico City along with his brother Alexis as a freestyle wrestler.

He had 2 children (Gregory & Robert), and 3 grandchildren (Adriana, Scarlett, River).
