= Japanese =

Japanese may refer to:

- Topics related to Japan, an island country in East Asia
- Japanese language, spoken mainly in Japan
- Japanese people, the ethnic group that identifies with Japan through ancestry or culture
  - Japanese diaspora, Japanese emigrants and their descendants around the world
- Japanese citizens, nationals of Japan under Japanese nationality law
  - Foreign-born Japanese, naturalized citizens of Japan
- Japanese writing system, consisting of kanji and kana
- Japanese cuisine, the food and food culture of Japan
- Japanese (Panamanian singer) (1973–2025), reggae and dancehall artist

== See also ==
- Japonica (disambiguation)
- Japanese studies
