= Japon =

Japon is the name for Japan in French, Japón (with accent) is the name in the Spanish language, and some other languages, but the pronunciation can change. It may also refer to:

== Geography ==
- Japons, a town in Austria

== Film ==
- Japón, a 2002 film by Carlos Reygadas

== Music ==
- Japón, a song by Calle 13
- Japón, a 1984 song by Mecano

== See also ==
- Japonisme
