= Anthology (Can album) =

Compilation album by Can
- Released: 1994
- Genre: Krautrock
- Length: 76:45 (CD1); 78:42 (CD2)
- Label: Spoon/Mute Records

Can chronology
Cannibalism 2 (1992)	Anthology (1994)	Cannibalism 3 (1994)

Professional ratings
Review scores
Source	Rating
AllMusic	4.5/5 stars
Pitchfork	8.8/10
The Rolling Stone Album Guide	3.5/5 stars

Anthology, also called Anthology - 25 Years and Anthology 1968-1993, is a compilation double album by Krautrock band Can which was released in 1994. Several of the songs are presented in edited form. The first CD has the same track listing as Can's 1978 compilation Cannibalism 1.

== Description ==
Anthology covers the 25-year period of Can's career, presenting tracks taken from their studio albums, exluding Out of Reach, as well as early outtakes. Some of the tracks are edited down into more abridged versions.

== Reception ==
AllMusic contributor, Keith Farley, enjoyed the alternative versions of the original songs edited down into short-form highlights, but still considered the original albums to be the better places to hear them. an excellent introduction to the band's 25-year career. Pitchfork's Joe Tangari commended the array of songs well-representing Can' discography, however, he lamented the omission of "Vitamin C" or "Sing Swan Song", which "would've made a better, more representative selection from Ege Bamyasi than the short edit of the chaotic 'Soup' that appears here".

Both Farley and Tangari agree on the prevalent "disregard for chronology or narrative". Tangari attributes the lack of chronology to the fact that some of the best Can's songs are relatively long, like in the case of "Future Days", released in 1973, being placed after "Half Past One", released in 1975).

== Track listing ==
Disc One
No.	Title	Writer(s)	Source	Length
1.	"Father Cannot Yell"	Holger Czukay, Michael Karoli, Jaki Liebezeit, Irmin Schmidt, Malcolm Mooney	Monster Movie (1969)	7:05
2.	"Soup"	Czukay, Karoli, Liebezeit, Schmidt, Damo Suzuki	Re-edited from Ege Bamyasi (1972)	3:03
3.	"Mother Sky"	Czukay, Karoli, Liebezeit, Schmidt, Suzuki	Re-edited from Soundtracks (1970)	6:41
4.	"She Brings the Rain"	Czukay, Karoli, Liebezeit, Schmidt, Mooney	Soundtracks	4:07
5.	"Mushroom"	Czukay, Karoli, Liebezeit, Schmidt, Suzuki	Tago Mago (1971)	4:31
6.	"One More Night"	Czukay, Karoli, Liebezeit, Schmidt, Suzuki	Ege Bamyasi	5:37
7.	"Outside My Door"	Czukay, Karoli, Liebezeit, Schmidt, Mooney	Monster Movie	4:11
8.	"Spoon"	Czukay, Karoli, Liebezeit, Schmidt, Suzuki	Ege Bamyasi	3:09
9.	"Halleluhwah"	Czukay, Karoli, Liebezeit, Schmidt, Suzuki	Re-edited from Tago Mago	5:39
10.	"Aumgn"	Czukay, Karoli, Liebezeit, Schmidt, Suzuki	Re-edited from Tago Mago	7:18
11.	"Dizzy Dizzy"	Czukay, Karoli, Liebezeit, Schmidt, Duncan Fallowell	Re-edited* from Soon Over Babaluma (1974)	3:30/5:41
12.	"Yoo Doo Right"	Czukay, Karoli, Liebezeit, Schmidt, Mooney	Monster Movie	20:20

Disc Two
No.	Title	Writer(s)	Source	Length
1.	"Uphill"	Czukay, Karoli, Liebezeit, Schmidt, Mooney	Delay 1968 (1981)	6:25
2.	"Mother Upduff"	Czukay, Karoli, Liebezeit, Schmidt, Mooney	Unlimited Edition (1976)	3:03
3.	"Doko E"	Czukay, Karoli, Liebezeit, Schmidt, Suzuki	Unlimited Edition	2:27
4.	"Musette"	Czukay, Karoli, Liebezeit, Schmidt	Unlimited Edition	2:15
5.	"Blue Bag"	Czukay, Karoli, Liebezeit, Schmidt, Suzuki	Unlimited Edition	1:15
6.	"TV Spot"	Czukay, Karoli, Liebezeit, Schmidt, Suzuki	Unlimited Edition	3:04
7.	"Half Past One"	Czukay, Karoli, Liebezeit, Schmidt	Landed (1975)	4:37
8.	"Moonshake"	Czukay, Karoli, Liebezeit, Schmidt, Suzuki	Future Days (1973)	3:02
9.	"Future Days"	Czukay, Karoli, Liebezeit, Schmidt, Suzuki	Future Days	9:28
10.	"Cascade Waltz"	Czukay, Karoli, Liebezeit, Schmidt, Peter Gilmour	Flow Motion (1976)	5:38
11.	"I Want More"	Czukay, Karoli, Liebezeit, Schmidt, Gilmour	Flow Motion	3:30
12.	"Animal Waves"	Czukay, Karoli, Liebezeit, Schmidt, Rosko Gee, Rebop Kwaku Baah	Re-edited from Saw Delight (1977)	8:09
13.	"Don't Say No"	Czukay, Karoli, Liebezeit, Schmidt, Gee, Baah, Gilmour	Saw Delight	6:35
14.	"Aspectacle"	Czukay, Karoli, Liebezeit, Schmidt, Gee	Re-edited* from Can (1979)	3:06/5:49
15.	"Below This Level"	Czukay, Karoli, Liebezeit, Schmidt, Mooney	Re-edited* from Rite Time (1989)	2:13/3:45
16.	"Hoolah Hoolah"	Czukay, Karoli, Liebezeit, Schmidt, Mooney	Rite Time	4:40
17.	"Last Night Sleep"	Karoli, Liebezeit, Schmidt, Mooney	Until the End of the world soundtrack (1991)	3:35

N.B. the re-edits on Disc One were originally done for the compilation Cannibalism in 1978.
(*) The 2007 Remastered Edition uses the album versions for "Dizzy Dizzy", "Aspectacle" and "Below This Level" instead of the edits used on the 1994 compilation.

== Personnel ==
- Holger Czukay – bass guitar (1968-1976, 1989), wave receiver & spec. sounds (1977), editing (1979), vocals
- Michael Karoli – guitar, electric violin, vocals
- Jaki Liebezeit – drums, percussion, vocals
- Irmin Schmidt – keyboards, vocals
- Malcolm Mooney – vocals (1968-1970, 1989-1991)
- Damo Suzuki – vocals, percussion (1970-1973)
- Rosko Gee – bass, vocals (1977-1979)
- Rebop Kwaku Baah – percussion, vocals (1977-1979)
