= Prehistoric Future =

Live album by Can
- Released: January 1985
- Recorded: June 1968
- Venue: Schloss Nörvenich, Cologne
- Length: 29:40
- Label: Tago Mago

Can chronology
Onlyou (1982)	Prehistoric Future (1985)	Rite Time (1989)

Prehistoric Future is a live album by German rock band Can, released as a limited edition cassette by the label Tago Mago in January 1985. It documents the group's first ever performance – a spontaneous improvised jam session that the group performed before an audience of artists at Cologne in June 1968, only days after their formation. At the time, Can were known as Inner Space.

The session is acknowledged for its historical import, with music critics and biographers highlighting the inventive music of the music and the free-form idiom it uses. It is often psychedelic in style and uses samples from tapes of student protests and Renaissance music.

== Composition ==
Prehistoric Future is a jam session album, and contains the majority of a free-form live improvisation that Can performed at Schloss Nörvenich, Cologne, to an audience of mostly artists and art lovers in June 1968, mere days after their formation. It was the first performance by the band, who at the time were still known as Inner Space, and their first recorded work overall. The author Uwe Schütte writes that the recording captures how Can "improvised together extensively, developing, refining and combining their own approach(es) to musical practice." David Stubbs says it captures the "first fruits of Can's jamming". Drummer Jaki Liebezeit later said that Can "never wrote anything, not on paper", but instead wrote "on tape".

The concert came about when Inner Space had been invited by Herr Vohwinkel to perform music at an art opening. Bassist and tape opeator Holger Czukay later named it the first time he played with loudspeakers and electric amplification. The flautists Manni Löhe and David Johnson appear as guests on the session; the latter is also credited for playing tapes. At one moment, keyboardist Irmin Schmidt can be heard destroying an open piano: "I was playing a Remington electric shaver on the strings, and [...] it made a horrible sound when the strings came off, so I destroyed it one of these evenings. It's on this tape, Prehistoric Future." The jam session also features clearly audible samples of student protests in Paris.

The first side of Prehistoric Future starts as a free-form psychedelic jam, with dominant flutes and droning vocals from Löhe. The piece then moves into a rhythmic section (somewhat reminiscent of the "minimalist funk beats" the band later performed) and then an amorphous section with unusual effects and a tape of Renaissance choral music. This continues into a space rock passage reminiscent of Pink Floyd before ending with a jazz passage, aided by a walking bassline and a blues vamp. As the end of side one approaches, Liebezeit enters free jazz mode while Johnson's tapes of demonstrating students in Paris enter the mix, manipulated by Czukay "to create unsteady pitch-shifting effects." As Can biographer Rob Young stated of Czukay's tapes:

"A few minutes earlier, it was the incongruous polyphonic religious music of Franco-Flemish Renaissance composer Pierre de la Rue; now, the sound of monastic contemplation has been replaced by a chorus of dissent, broadcast directly from the streets of Paris. Tapes of early music were frequently used by the Inner Space group at this time. [...] These "samples" of early music add depth and texture to the picture. But Can's own spontaneous compositions can also be heard taking shape, as when, around five minutes into the second half, Michael's guitar tolls out the hymn-like refrain from the theme tune to Agilok & Blubbo."

The second side is more coherent, beginning with a draggy rhythm of scraping noises that have been compared to early industrial music before moving into a more energetic, beat-driven section that gets increasingly denser and louder before ending with "a stampede of drums."

It is a rare example of Can recorded live in concert prior to 1972; from their 1968 formation until 1971, the band played to small audiences and portable recording gear was seldom used.

== Release and reception ==
Professional ratings
Review scores
Source	Rating
AllMusic	3/5 stars
Encyclopedia of Popular Music	3/5 stars
Sounds	3.5/5 stars

Prehistoric Future was released as a limited edition cassette by the label Tago Mago in the week of 21–25 January 1985, alongside a reissue of Can (1979), at the time the band's final work (in contrast to Prehistoric Future being their first).

In his review for Sounds, David Elliott described Prehistoric Future as "a fairly structureless and crudely recorded half-hour jam," as well as "a blueprint for later semi-improvised pieces like 'Soup', 'Aumgn' and 'Pinch', but perhaps these seeds of inspiration are a little too embryonic to be of any great worth", finally deeming the album to be "of more historical than musical interest."

Retrospectively, Rolf Semprebon of AllMusic describes it as "Can at its primitive roots, the bandmembers spontaneously inventing themselves from the raw elements of rock, jazz, ethnic music, and avant-garde." He adds that the music is sprawling and eclectic, being less focused than later Can recordings, but still "fascinating in its own right": "The album may be a little rough around the edges, but when one considers the group had only been together for a few days, this is pretty remarkable stuff."

With reference to Prehistoric Future, Stubbs wrote in The Times that Can "created a new type of music". Uncut magazine write that Prehistoric Future "documents a free-form freakout" from 1968 and "sounds like a band finding its place, looking for a reason to exist. The unbroken improvisation resembles a set by AMM, Musica Elettronica Viva or perhaps Pink Floyd in one of their interstellar interludes. There's little hint of the monolithic grooves they would later carve out; here they were still shedding their attachments to experimental music."

Can biographer Rob Young called the Prehistoric Future session "remarkable" for a group in its first months of existence, commenting that it "sounds like nothing else of its time."

== Track listing ==
1. "Side one" – 15:40
2. "Side two" – 14:00

== Personnel ==
Adapted from Jaki Liebezeit: The Life, Theory and Practice of a Master Drummer

- Holger Czukay – bass, editing, mastering
- Irmin Schmidt – keyboards
- Michael Karoli – guitar
- Jaki Liebezeit – drums
- Manni Löhe – flute
- David Johnson – flute, tapes
