= The Peel Sessions (Can album) =

Compilation album by Can
- Released: November 1995
- Recorded: 1973–1975
- Genre: Experimental rock
- Length: 66:11
- Label: Strange Fruit

Can chronology
Anthology (1994)	The Peel Sessions (1995)	Sacrilege (1997)

Professional ratings
Review scores
Source	Rating
AllMusic	4.5/5 stars

The Peel Sessions is a compilation album by the German experimental rock band Can. Released in November 1995, it contains songs from four sessions recorded for John Peel's Radio 1 show. The sessions took place in February 1973 (track 1), January 1974 (track 4), October 1974 (tracks 2 & 3), and May 1975 (tracks 5 & 6). The songs are mostly unreleased improvisations. Different recordings of "Geheim" (as "Half Past One") and "Mighty Girl" (as "November") were released on Landed and Out of Reach respectively.

== Track listing ==
All tracks composed by Can.

1. "Up the Bakerloo Line with Anne" – 18:49
2. "Return to BB City" – 8:27
3. "Tape Kebab" – 8:58
4. "Tony Wanna Go" – 14:31
5. "Geheim (Half Past One)" – 6:42
6. "Mighty Girl" – 8:41

== Personnel ==
Can

- Holger Czukay – bass guitar
- Michael Karoli – guitar
- Jaki Liebezeit – drums
- Irmin Schmidt – keyboards
- Damo Suzuki – vocals (Track 1 only)
