= Unlimited Edition (album) =

1976 compilation album by Can

Compilation album by Can
- Released: May 1976
- Recorded: September 1968 – July 1975
- Genre: Krautrock
- Length: 77:22
- Labels: Harvest; Caroline
- Producer: Can

Can chronology
Landed (1975)	Unlimited Edition (1976)	Flow Motion (1976)

Professional ratings
Review scores
Source	Rating
AllMusic	3/5 stars
Encyclopedia of Popular Music	3/5 stars
Pitchfork	7.9/10
The Rolling Stone Album Guide	3/5 stars

Limited Edition

Compilation album by Can
- Released: 1974
- Recorded: September 1968 – May 1974
- Genre: Krautrock
- Length: 38:14
- Label: United Artists
- Producer: Can

Can chronology
Future Days (1973)	Limited Edition (1974)	Soon Over Babaluma (1974)

Unlimited Edition is a compilation album by the krautrock band Can, released by Harvest Records in 1976 as a double album. Beforehand, United Artists Records released Limited Edition LP in 1974, which was a limited release of 15,000 copies. Unlimited Edition is a re-release of Limited Edition, adding tracks 14–19.

The compilations collect unreleased music across the band's history from 1968 to 1975, and feature both of the band's major singers (Damo Suzuki and Malcolm Mooney). The cover photos were taken among the Elgin Marbles in the Duveen Gallery of the British Museum.

== Background ==
The compilation albums were "an interim measure" for Can's record company requiring some commercial activity, before the band could release a studio album. United Artists Records licensed the Limited Edition compilation and expanded it to a double LP with a further six unreleased tracks, under the title Unlimited Edition.

Limited Edition was curated by Duncan Fallowell, British journalist and occasional Can collaborator.

Can recorded the song "Fall of Another Year" in the summer of 1969 during their stay in Zurich. The band visited Zurich after receiving an invitation to orchestrate a live score for Prometheus Bound play staged in Schauspielhaus Zürich theater, and recorded "Fall of Another Year" in theater's cellar room "with awful acoustics". The other songs recorded in Zurich include "Thief" from 1982 compilation album Delay 1968 and "She Brings the Rain" from 1970 album Soundtracks.

According to Irmin Schmidt, the song "Cutaway" was assembled into a collage with fragments recorded within a seven-year period. The fragments are "partially copied one after another at different speeds, on top of each other and so on".

== Track notes ==
The abbreviation "E.F.S.", appearing in several of the track titles, refers to Ethnological Forgery Series, a series of songs in which Can "indulged their fascination with non-Western instruments, scales and rhythms".

The song "Doko E" is an excerpt from a free improvisation recorded at a reunion party in Schloss Nörvenich with a small invited audience, dated shortly before the first Future Days recording sessions. The excerpt is taken from half an hour performance, where "Jaki set up a plodding beat like a donkey bumping along the mountain trails of Provence, as Damo vented his frustrations with his recent stay" in Japan. The lyrics explore Damo's return to his homeland in Japan, which either wasn't his home any longer, or "that he no longer recognised himself in the mirror of his childhood surroundings". "Doko e" means "where to" in Japanese.

"Mother Upduff" is a retelling of an urban legend involving a family whose grandmother dies while they are on holiday together, and whose corpse—left wrapped up on the roof of the family car—is later stolen along with the car. The recording of tracks "I'm Too Leise" and "LH 702 (Nairobi/München)" are seen in the film Can Free Concert 1972 by Peter Przygodda.

== Reception ==
Dominique Leone of Pitchfork, writing a retrospective review for Unlimited Edition, said the album was "one of the most underrated items in the band's catalog", especially praising "Gomorrha", "Ibis", "The Empress and the Ukraine King", "Mother Upduff", "Connection", and "Fall of Another Year". Leone described some of the "Ethnological Forgery Series" compositions as "sometimes bizarre, sometimes funny, wherein Can raid the world's various indigenous music and make stuff that would make both Steve Reich and Boredoms proud". Leone compared "Cutaway" to Faust recordings.

In AllMusic review, Ned Raggett described Unlimited Edition as "very much a dog's breakfast—albeit a highly entertaining one", saying the older songs are "manna from heaven for those interested in the band's roots". Reggett praised "a lot of" the tracks that "easily stands up on its own", highlighting "Cutaway", "The Empress and the Ukraine King", "I'm Too Leise", "Mother Upduff", and "Gomorrha". Though Reggett added that "a few tracks are seemingly here to fill space".

== Track listing ==
Note: Tracks 14–19 only included on Unlimited Edition.
All tracks composed by Can

Side one
No.	Title	Recorded	Length
1.	"Gomorrha"	December 1973	5:41
2.	"Doko E"	August 1973	2:26
3.	"LH 702 (Nairobi/München)"	March 1972	2:11
4.	"I'm Too Leise"	March 1972	5:10
5.	"Musette"	January 1970	2:08
6.	"Blue Bag (Inside Paper)"	October 1970	1:16

Side two
No.	Title	Recorded	Length
7.	"E.F.S. No. 27"	December 1970	1:47
8.	"TV Spot"	April 1971	3:02
9.	"E.F.S. No. 7"	September 1968	1:05
10.	"The Empress and the Ukraine King"	January 1969	4:40
11.	"E.F.S. No. 10"	January 1969	2:01
12.	"Mother Upduff"	May 1969	4:28
13.	"E.F.S. No. 36"	May 1974	1:55

Side three
No.	Title	Recorded	Length
14.	"Cutaway"	March 1969	18:49 (Note: On the remastered CD editions, this track has been shortened to 17:11.)
15.	"Connection"	March 1969	2:56

Side four
No.	Title	Recorded	Length
16.	"Fall of Another Year"	August 1969	3:20
17.	"E.F.S. No. 8"	November 1968	1:37
18.	"Transcendental Express"	July 1975	4:37
19.	"Ibis"	September 1974	9:19

== Personnel ==
- Holger Czukay – bass guitar, tape effects
- Michael Karoli – guitar, violin, shehnai on track 3
- Jaki Liebezeit – drums, percussion, winds on tracks 4, 9, 11, 14, 16
- Irmin Schmidt – keyboards, synthesizer, schizophone on track 10, voice on tracks 8 and 14
- Damo Suzuki – vocals on tracks 2, 4, 6, 7, 8
- Malcolm Mooney – vocals on tracks 10, 12, 14, 15, 16

== Production credits ==
- Composed, written and produced by Can
- Recording by Holger Czukay and René Tinner at CAN Studio, Weilerswist, Germany
- Front cover collage – Trevor Key

== Works cited ==
- Young, Rob; Schmidt, Irmin (2018). All Gates Open: The Story of Can (e-book ed.). London: Faber and Faber. ISBN 978-0-571-31151-4.
