= Out of Reach (album) =

Studio album by Can
- Released: July 1978
- Recorded: October 1977
- Studios: Inner Space Studio (Weilerswist, West Germany)
- Genres: Krautrock; disco; Latin rock
- Length: 35:38
- Label: Harvest
- Producer: Can

Can chronology
Saw Delight (1977)	Out of Reach (1978)	Can (1979)

Out of Reach is the ninth studio album by the German krautrock band Can, released through Harvest Records in 1978. It is the second Can album, after Saw Delight, featuring bassist Rosko Gee and percussionist Reebop Kwaku Baah. On Out of Reach, the band continued exploring a new musical direction, inspired by disco and latin rock.

Some critics called it "probably the least loved music Can ever made", assessing that Gee and Baah "seem to impose too strict a sense of rhythm on Can's once free-flowing music, diluted with insipid reggae riffs". Some of them, however, highlighted "Serpentine", "November", and "One More Day" as the tracks closest to anything resembling former spirit of Can. Irmin Schmidt, Can's keyboard player, called Out of Reach the climax of the band's confusion, "musically and psychologically, and in every sense it's bad".

== Background and production ==
The founding bass player and producer Holger Czukay, who already started drifting away from Can on their previous record, left the band before the recording sessions for Out of Reach. As a partial result of Czukay's departure, style of bassist Rosko Gee and percussionist Reebop Kwaku Baah dominated on this album (particularly on "Give Me No 'Roses'" and "Like Inobe God"). Drummer Jaki Liebezeit was losing interest in the band at the time, leaving most of the percussion duties to Baah. Keyboardist Irmin Schmidt, as well, unhappy with the Can's musical direction, and "the falling out with Holger had left a nasty aftertaste" for the band.

Since the Can's usual producer, Czukay, refused to work on the record, the band handed down the production to Conny Plank. Plank, according to Czukay, "got very angry that he said 'I don’t touch with my hands this music!' Conny was saying to him later, why have he done that? Now Plank have to take on his shoulders all the shit."

== Music ==
Rosko Gee wrote and performed vocals on "Pauper's Daughter and I", quoting the "Jack and Jill" nursery rhyme, and on "Give Me No 'Roses'". Reebop Kwaku Baah sings on "Like Inobe God." The four other songs are instrumental: "Serpentine", "November", "Seven Days Awake", and "One More Day". A simpler version of "November" was called "Mighty Girl" in the May 1975 session for BBC's John Peel Show.

Schmidt told Ian Harrison that "Reebop… seduced Jaki to start playing very fast… You hear it already on Saw Delight—Jaki gets very nervous. Which could be marvellous… but with Reebop, and on Out of Reach, it really got out of reach and control."

Rob Young, the author of Can biography, chose "November" to exemplifying the general flaws of Out of Reach. "November" lacks "sense of space, inner or outer, in its production. Plangent grand piano comps around grouchy chords, as congas and Jaki's busy snare keep up an unvarying chatter. Everyone is always on, there appears to be little dialogue happening on a musical level, and it is all to no obvious purpose or destination."

Young saw "Serpentine" and "One More Day" as nearing closest to anything resembling former spirit of Can "in both title and feel". On "Serpentine", Irmin "resorted to his piano to cut through "Serpentine's dense mulch", and both Jaki and Michael display an encouraging agility. As with every other track here, "One More Day" refuses to open up any space, though it's the most experimental piece sonically, with "wibbly synthetic effects applied to the drums and grinding atonal synth".

On "Give Me No 'Roses'", Irmin is "practically inaudible, apart from a dab of squelchily inappropriate, grouchy synth in the final minute".

== Release ==
Out of Reach has variously been reissued as a double CD with Can's 1979 release Can (also known as Inner Space after the band's recording studio) and on its own in several single CD versions (e.g. on MagMid (TKO Magnum Music) in the United Kingdom), but was more difficult to find than other Can albums.

It was disowned by the band for many years (hence its rather haphazard reissue history) and was not listed as part of their discography on their official website. It was not issued either as part of Spoon Records' first CD reissues of most of their albums in 1989, nor in a remastered Super Audio CD edition in 2006, unlike all the other Can studio albums.

It was finally officially re-issued by Spoon Records, in CD, vinyl and digital formats, on 18 August 2014.

== Reception ==
Retrospective professional reviews
Review scores
Source	Rating
AllMusic	2/5 stars
The Encyclopedia of Popular Music	2/5 stars
Pitchfork	3.7/10
The Rolling Stone Album Guide	1/5 stars

Out of Reach contained "probably the least loved music Can ever made, and also possibly the least heard too". Irmin Schmidt, Can's keyboard player, called Out of Reach the climax of Can's confusion, "musically and psychologically, and in every sense it's bad". He said its title was prophetic. Stewart Mason, in the AllMusic's retrospective review, claimed that many fans don't consider Out of Reach to be a "true Can album", because only two founding members are fully involved in its creation, with a diminished contribution from Liebezeit.

In a contemporary review, Ian Penman assessed Out of Reach as "a stab, no more" with "tangled, intriguing, infuriating music". For him, the songs did not "caress sentiment: they go straight for the nerves, the darkness of the heard… A feeling, not surprisingly, of moving into shadows and not emerging again." The closing track "One More Day" represented "what Can were all about: structured such that play might be limitless".

As a highlight, Mason praised Rosko Gee's jazz-influenced playing, specifically on the centerpiece improvisations on "November" and "Serpentine". Pitchfork reviewer, Mark Richardson, also praised Gee's parts, and recalled that "Baah's percussion is sometimes the most interesting thing going", joining in on his praise of "Serpentine" with interesting interplay between Liebezeit and Baah, and lauding "November" as an epic, widescreen drama.

On a more negative side, journalist Andy Gill opined that Gee and Baah "seem to impose too strict a sense of rhythm on Can's once free-flowing music, which are diluted with insipid reggae riffs." He called Out of Reach "a poor record". Richardson, conceptually, liked the Can's exploration of "Latin disco rock", the genre known for "thick layers and elasticity", but he didn't enjoy the result. "Give Me No 'Roses'" was labeled by Richardson as an "OK lite-rock fluff" with chorus containing Out of Reach's "only successful hook", but the song gets ruined by weak vocals. Both Mason and Richardson believed "Pauper's Daughter and I" to one of the worst songs on Out of Reach because of its "comically off-key vocals", and AllMusic chose "Like Inobe God" as the album's worst recording, also considered to be a contender for the nadir of Can's entire output.

Additionally, Richardson criticized the mismatched mix, feeling like stitched together recordings made at different times.

== Track listing ==
All tracks are written by Michael Karoli, Jaki Liebezeit, Irmin Schmidt, Rosko Gee, and Reebop Kwaku Baah, except where noted.

Side one
No.	Title	Written by	Length
1.	"Serpentine"		4:03
2.	"Pauper's Daughter and I"	Rosko Gee	5:57
3.	"November"		7:37
Total length:			17:37

Side two
No.	Title	Written by	Length
1.	"Seven Days Awake"		5:12
2.	"Give Me No 'Roses'"	Gee	5:21
3.	"Like Inobe God"		5:51 (Note: 6:18 on remastered edition.)
4.	"One More Day"		1:37
Total length:			18:01 (35:38)

== Personnel ==
According to the liner notes:

Can

- Jaki Liebezeit - drums
- Michael Karoli - guitars, violins on "Roses"
- Irmin Schmidt - keyboards
- Rosko Gee - bass, vocals on "Roses" and "Pauper's Daughter and I", Fender piano on "Roses", flangbass on "Seven Days Awake" and "Serpentine"
- Reebop Kwaku Baah - percussion, Polymoog on "Roses", vocals on "Like Inobe God"

Other personnel

- René Tinner - recording engineer
- Conny Plank - mixing
- Hildegard Schmidt - manager
- A. Backhausen - photography, cover design

== Works cited ==
- Young, Rob; Schmidt, Irmin (2018). All Gates Open: The Story of Can (e-book ed.). London: Faber and Faber. ISBN 978-0-571-31151-4.
