= Unlimited Edition =

Unlimited Edition may refer to:

- Unlimited Edition (album), a compilation album by the experimental rock group Can
- Unlimited (Magic: The Gathering), the second Magic: The Gathering set of cards
