= Flow Motion =

Studio album by Can
- Released: 3 October 1976
- Recorded: June 1976
- Studios: Inner Space Studio, Weilerswist, near Cologne
- Genres: Krautrock; reggae
- Length: 37:37
- Labels: Harvest; Virgin
- Producer: Can

Can chronology
Unlimited Edition (1976)	Flow Motion (1976)	Saw Delight (1977)

Flow Motion is the seventh studio album by German rock band Can. It was released in October 1976 and features the UK hit single "I Want More".

== Recording and production ==
Recording sessions for what would become Flow Motion began at Can's Inner Space Studio in Cologne in the spring of 1976. Since their previous album Landed, the band had been recording on a state-of-the-art 16-track machine, which had changed the dynamics of the group and the way they recorded. Instead of playing everything live together, different members could now record their parts separately. Bryan Bierman of Magnet Magazine highlighted the recording process, along with their embrace of rhythms (especially disco rhythms), as leading factors in the lowered appraisal of rock music fans and critics at the album's release.

Flow Motion was mixed using "Artificial Head" binaural stereo. All lyrics were written by Peter Gilmour, the band's live sound engineer. Irmin and Michael cherry-picked the parts they liked the most and performed them. Michael preferred simple texts that he could sing and wanted the words to be rhythmic.

The cover features a photograph taken by the band member, Michael Karoli.

== Music ==
Throughout their career, Can had experimented with a number of different sounds. With Flow Motion, the band became cleaner, more playful, and laid-back, adding disco and reggae to the list. Apart from the new rhythms, the influence of recording with 16 tracks meant there are multiple guitar lines from Michael Karoli, and Irmin Schmidt's keyboards also come to the fore, giving Flow Motion much more shimmering atmosphere.

A disco vibe dominates the opening track "I Want More"—short, catchy, and danceable. The song was released as a single and became a hit, reaching number 26 in the UK Singles Chart in August 1976. The band even appeared on Top of the Pops to perform the song.

"Laugh Till You Cry, Live Till You Die (O.R.N.)" became Can's debut effort in the style of reggae. Michael, who also devised the text, has been inspired by Jamaican music introduced to him by Brian Eno, during Eno's time in Germany. Reggae infuses most of the rest of the album, although Can experiments with rhythm and instrumentation, rather than playing it straight. This is exemplified on "Cascade Waltz", which combines a reggae beat with a waltz, and on "Laugh Till You Cry - Live Till You Die (O.R.N.)", which features guitarist Karoli playing the Turkic bağlama.

After the reprise of the opening track "...And More", which finishes side one of the original vinyl album, side two opens with "Babylonian Pearl", which is evocative of "Come Sta, La Luna" on Soon Over Babaluma. The song's vocals are handled by Irmin Schmidt, and speak about a girl who "comes from a land where woman is man".

The next song, the gloomy-sounding "Smoke (E.F.S. No. 59)", is a "filmic fog of rumbling, ominous drums, saturated with metallic clangs and distant war bugles. It connects the dots between African log rhythms and the approaching metallic tattoos of industrialists like Test Dept, with a nod to the phase music of Steve Reich". The titular track, "Flow Motion", closes the album with another reggae-based tune. "Jaki halves the speed of his "I Want More" riff, and Michael overdubs several layers of guitars, a taut upbeat in the manner of Jamaica's legions of dub sessioneers, and solarised, feedbacking flareups in the right ear. Half submerged in the mix, he [Michael] mutters about teeth and ears grinding to the roots, and repeats the title. Holger's sliding fingers never deviate from his two-note perimeter."

== Critical reception ==
=== Contemporary reviews ===
Vivien Goldman of Sounds Magazine praised the album's "android/mechanoid pulsebeat", which are "fun to listen, with creative insanity to this fine example of a mature, imaginative descendant of classical rock. And see what happens… The ideal way to appreciate Can is to go limp and flow with the motion."

A few months after the release of Flow Motion, Holger Czukay told an interviewer that "there is one common thing which everybody appreciated from the very first moment and that is the reggae influence. For me, when it comes to reggae music, I really can get crazy!"

=== Retrospective reviews ===
Retrospective professional reviews
Review scores
Source	Rating
Allmusic	3/5 stars
Encyclopedia of Popular Music	3/5 stars
(The New) Rolling Stone Album Guide	2/5 stars

(The New) Rolling Stone Album Guide, published in 2004, considered Flow Motion to be "something of a mess"—a slick, commercial record sabotaged by "woozy atonality". Nevertheless, the album guide liked "I Want More", a "stab at disco graced with a fabulous Karoli tremolo riff". Stewart Mason of AllMusic called Flow Motion—the band's most commercially successful, but a divisive record in the group's canon, which Mason says "many fans dismiss" because of its commercial bent. Mason thought Flow Motion wasn't one of the best Can records, but "deserved better than its poor reputation in some circles". He praised "Smoke (E.F.S. No. 59)" and the title track "Flow Motion".

In 2012, Magnet Magazine labelled it a "hidden gem".

According to Rob Young, the author of Can's biography, the band's hit single "I Want More" proved that Can's tape-based methodology has been slowly integrating into the popular music, and "in the realm of disco and dub reggae, the idea of a long-form, repetitive beat, constructed from tape loops or drum machines, was fast becoming standard practice".

== Track listing ==
Side one
No.	Title	Lyrics	Music	Length
1.	"I Want More"	Peter Gilmour	Czukay, Karoli, Liebezeit, Schmidt	3:29
2.	"Cascade Waltz"	Peter Gilmour	Czukay, Karoli, Liebezeit, Schmidt	5:35
3.	"Laugh Till You Cry - Live Till You Die (O.R.N.)"	Peter Gilmour, Michael Karoli	Czukay, Karoli, Liebezeit, Schmidt	6:43
4.	"...And More"	Peter Gilmour	Czukay, Karoli, Liebezeit, Schmidt	2:43

Side two
No.	Title	Lyrics	Music	Length
5.	"Babylonian Pearl"	Peter Gilmour	Czukay, Karoli, Liebezeit, Schmidt	3:29
6.	"Smoke (E.F.S. No. 59)"	none	Czukay, Karoli, Liebezeit, Schmidt	5:15
7.	"Flow Motion"	none	Czukay, Karoli, Liebezeit, Schmidt	10:23

== Personnel ==
Can

- Holger Czukay – bass, djin on "Smoke", backing vocals on "I Want More", "...And More" and "Smoke"
- Michael Karoli – guitars, slide guitar, electric violin on "Cascade Waltz", bağlama on "Laugh Till You Cry - Live Till You Die (O.R.N.)", background noise on "Smoke", lead vocals on "Cascade Waltz" and "Laugh Till You Cry - Live Till You Die (O.R.N.)", backing vocals on "I Want More", "...And More" and "Flow Motion"
- Jaki Liebezeit – drums, percussion, backing vocals on "I Want More", "...And More"
- Irmin Schmidt – keyboard, Alpha 77, lead vocals on "Babylonian Pearl" and "I Want More" and "...And More"

Production

- Can – producers
- Simon Puxley – producer (only on "Cascade Waltz")
- Holger Czukay – recording
- René Tinner – recording
- Manfred Schunke – mixer
