= Rob Young (writer, born 1968) =

British writer and journalist (born 1968)

Rob Young (born 1968) is a British writer and journalist who has written about music and television.

== Early life ==
Young was born in Bristol.

== Career ==
He is a music journalist and has worked at The Wire magazine since 1993, including five years as editor (March 2000 to February 2004). He also contributes to Uncut, Sight and Sound, Frieze and ArtReview.

Warp (2005) is a history of Warp Records. Electric Eden (2010) is about the history of British folk music in the 1960s and 1970s. All Gates Open: The Story of Can (2018) is a biography of the German experimental rock band Can. The Magic Box: Viewing Britain through the Rectangular Window (2021) is a history of British television from the late 1950s to the late 1980s.

== Publications ==
- Warp. Labels Unlimited. Black Dog Publishing, 2005. ISBN 9781904772323. With an essay by Adrian Shaughnessy.
- Electric Eden: Unearthing Britain's Visionary Music (Faber & Faber, 2010)
- All Gates Open: The Story of Can (Faber & Faber, 2018) – with Irmin Schmidt
- The Magic Box: Viewing Britain through the Rectangular Window (Faber & Faber, 2021)
