= Paul Delph =

American musician

- Paul Delph, c. 1996, from the CD liner notes for his final album A God That Can Dance

Background information
- Born: Paul Lee Delph; February 28, 1957; Cincinnati, Ohio, U.S.
- Died: May 21, 1996 (aged 39) Cincinnati, Ohio, U.S.
- Occupations: Singer, songwriter, producer, engineer, studio musician
- Instruments: Vocals, keyboards

Paul Lee Delph (February 28, 1957 – May 21, 1996) was a Los Angeles-based singer, songwriter, producer, engineer, and studio musician whose catalog includes work with many well-known recording artists from the late 1970s through the mid-1990s. Delph died from complications of HIV/AIDS at his parents' home in Cincinnati, Ohio. His ashes are interred at Spring Grove Cemetery in Cincinnati. A panel in Delph's name is part of the NAMES Project AIDS Memorial Quilt.

== History ==
=== 1980–1987: The band years ===
==== Zoo Drive ====
From 1980 to 1987 Paul was the keyboardist/vocalist for the band Zoo Drive which also featured John Goodsall (guitar), Doug Lunn (bass) and Ric Parnell (drums). They made their primary living touring and recording as rhythm section for many artists. The best known of these projects was the Word of Mouth album by Toni Basil. The song "Mickey" which featured Paul on Farfisa organ went to #1 on the Billboard singles chart in December 1982.

==== Zahara ====
In 1983 he recorded an album with Zahara, a group with several notable members including Reebop Kwaku Baah (percussion), Bryson Graham (drums) and Rosko Gee (bass). Delph performed keyboards.

=== 1987–1991: Solo projects and movie soundtracks ===
==== North Shore ====
Delph co-wrote & sang lead vocals on the de facto theme song for the 1987 film North Shore titled "North Shore Roar" which was co-written & performed with his Zoo Drive bandmates.

==== Walk the Walk ====
From 1988 to 1991 Paul fronted his own solo project called "Walk the Walk". in 1992 he released his first solo album titled, Release.

==== Bloodsport ====
Bloodsport's 1988 original film soundtrack contains the songs "Fight to Survive" and "On My Own – Alone", both performed by Stan Bush. Bush's songs were replaced on the 1990 home media soundtrack release with alternate versions sung by Paul Delph, who was nominated for a Grammy for this work. On June 26, 2007, Perseverance Records released a limited edition CD of the soundtrack including, for the first time, the original film versions of the Stan Bush songs.

=== 1996-2003: Final album and future releases ===
==== A God That Can Dance ====
Delph's final album, A God That Can Dance, was privately released to his family and friends before his death in 1996. It chronicles the artist's struggle with HIV/AIDS and draws its title from a quote attributed in the liner notes to Friedrich Nietzsche (1844 – 1900):

I would believe only in a God that knew how to dance.

— Thus Spoke Zarathustra

==== Remastering and wide release ====
Growing interest in Delph's legacy later caused A God That Can Dance to be officially released on CD in 2003. It was digitally remastered and featured new artwork designed by Billy Vaughn, with inserts containing all the lyrics, credits and updated biography information. All sales of the album were to benefit the Paul Delph Memorial Scholarship Fund.

==== Potential future releases ====
After the wide release of A God That Can Dance in 2003, five additional Paul Delph collections were to follow, but these have not yet been released as of 2020.

== Collaborators ==
Artists with whom Delph worked include:

Bryan Adams, Doug Webb, Jon Anderson, Roy Thomas Baker, Glenn Hughes and Pat Thrall, Peter Banks, Toni Basil, Peabo Bryson, Richard Burmer, Mike Chapman, Ava Cherry, Alice Cooper, Michael Des Barres, Rhett Davies, Bob Esty, Roberta Flack, John Goodsall, Sam Harris, Phyllis Hyman, Alphonso Johnson, Johnny Mandel, Martin Page, The Pointer Sisters, Suzi Quatro, Robbie Robertson, Jimmie Spheeris, Donna Summer, Bernie Taupin, Chester Thomson, Gino Vannelli, The Weather Girls, Alee Willis and Gary Wright.

== Repertoire ==
Performances on The Tonight Show and opening concerts for The Police, The Moody Blues and Iggy Pop, television scores for Falcon Crest, Perfect Strangers, Full House and film scores for Universal Studios and Lorimar Productions were also part of his repertoire.

== Discography ==
=== Studio albums ===
- Release (1992)

=== Posthumous studio albums ===
- A God That Can Dance (2003)

=== Soundtrack appearances ===
- "Only One Thing" (from No Small Affair) (1984)
- "Save Me", "We're Not Dead Yet", "Jackie O", "Electric Man", "So Lonely" (from Dance Electric) (1985)
- "North Shore Roar" with Zoo (from North Shore) (1987)
- "Fight to Survive", "On My Own - Alone" (from the Bloodsport soundtrack album) (1990)
