= Michael von Biel =

German composer, cellist and artist (born 1937)

Michael von Biel (born 30 June 1937) is a German composer, cellist, and graphic artist.

== Life ==
Biel was born in Hamburg, the son of Werner von Biel and Ursula von Biel (née Lampert). After finishing school in Canterbury, England, he studied piano, theory, and composition in Toronto (1956–57), Vienna (1958–60), New York (1960, with Morton Feldman, amongst others), London (1961–62, with Cornelius Cardew), and Cologne (with Karlheinz Stockhausen). From 1961 to 1963 he attended the Darmstadt International Vacation/Holiday Courses for New Music. In 1964 he received a commission from the WDR for the electronic piece Fassung, completed after six months of work. From 1965 to 1966 he was Composer in Residence at the State University of New York in Buffalo.

Since 1966 Michael von Biel has lived in Cologne sharing a flat with fellow composer Irmin Schmidt. In Cologne, he came into contact with artists of the Fluxus movement. His Jagdstück (Hunting Piece, 1966) for brass, contrabass, tape, and amplified barbecues was premiered in 1968. Following the release of Jagdstück, From 1968 to 1969, von Biel studied with Joseph Beuys at the Kunstakademie Düsseldorf. In the following years he created works in the visual realm especially.

Holger Czukay, a pupil of Stockhausen, called Biel a "real punker", and Rob Young, writing a biography for Cologne band Can, described Biel's style as "pushing compositional framework to the limits of noise, using extended techniques including excessive pressure on bowed instruments, playing behind the bridge to create overtones".

In February 2023, MusikTexte, ON Cologne, and the Cologne University of Music and Dance organized "Farewell to New Music?" festival in Cologne, celebrating musical and painting oeuvre of Michael von Biel.

== Compositions (selective list) ==
- Für Klavier no.1–3 (three piano pieces for Morton Feldman), for piano four-hands (1960–61)
- Book for Three, for violin and two pianos, or three pianos (1961–62)
- Doubles, 29 pieces for violin and piano (1961)
- String Quartet No. 1 (1962)
- String Quartet No. 2 (1963)
- Fassung, electronic music for four loudspeaker groups(1963–64)
- Quartett mit Begleitung, for string quartet and cello (1965)
- Deklination, for alto voice, piano, 3 percussionists, harp, cello, contrabass, and electronics (1965)
- Welt I and II, action scores (1965–66)
- The Plain of S'cairn, for five or more winds and five or more strings (1966)
- Jagdstück for brass, contrabass, tape, and amplified barbecues (1966)
- Composition for orchestra (1968)
- Deutsche Landschaften, for solo cello (1970)
- Cello Concerto (1971)
- Übungsstück, for solo cello with filtered feedback (1971)
- Preludes, for cello (1972)
- 13 traditionelle Stücke, for 2 guitars (1974–77)
- Pieces for two guitars (1976)
- Fragment, for two electric guitars (1981)
- Nineteen Pieces for piano, synthesizer, glockenspiel, percussion, and electric guitar (1985)
- Twenty-eight Pieces for Piano (1987–89)
- Acht Projekt (Aufsatzstück), for piano (1992)
- Pieces for piano (1992)
