= Minami Deutsch =

Japanese krautrock band

- Origin: Tokyo, Japan
- Genres: Krautrock, psychedelic
- Years active: 2014–present
- Label: Guruguru Brain
- Members: Kyotaro Miula; Yuichi Ushioda; Keita Ise; Kosei Terunuma
- Past members: Riki Hidaka; Tatsuhiko Rauschenberg; Taku Idemoto; Keisuke Ise; Takuya Nozaki; Hikari Sakashita; Masahito Goda

Minami Deutsch (Japanese: 南ドイツ, Hepburn: Minami Doitsu) are a Japanese krautrock band founded by guitarist and vocalist Kyotaro Miulain in Tokyo in 2014. Their name translates into English as "South German".

== History ==
Minami Deutsch was formed by guitarist and vocalist Kyotaro Miula in Tokyo in 2014, who subsequently recruited guitarist Riki Hidaka, bassist Keita Ise and drummer Kosei Terunuma. They released a self-titled debut through the British Cardinal Fuzz label on 26 September 2015, getting praise from CBS News contributor, Dave Pehling, for "unique approach to repetition rhythms and heady atmospherics" on the lengthy cuts "Futsu Ni Ikirenai" and "Übergleich Part II".

Before the next release, the group signed with Guruguru Brain, a label established by another Japanese psych rock band Kikagaku Moyo, which reissued their debut and released their second album With Dim Light (2018). Pitchfork reviewer, Patrick St. Michel, complemented Minami Deutsch for "studiously testing the limits of repetition" on With Dim Light, and in comparison to the previous release "allowing some original flair" into their tracks. The album features four guest percussionists, including Kikagaku Moyo's Go Kurosawa, who supply each song with "its own character". Minami Deutsch promoted the 2018 release with their first large-scale U.S. tour, supporting Kikagaku Moyo and performing live at the Roadburn Festival with former Can vocalist Damo Suzuki, a collaboration that resulted into a special EP issued a year later. The band released their third album in 2022. They composed soundtrack for the Japanese film Lapse (2019). Around 2023 Miula moved from Japan to Berlin, Germany, believing German scene—psychedelic, dark and experimental—fits well with his music taste.

Minami Deutsch took part in the 2024 edition of the Adelaide Fringe festival. They performed as opener during Blood Incantation's European tour that started in April 2024. In October 2025, the band joined psych band Earthless as co-headliners for dates across USA, including the Midwest and West Coast. They played 21 shows in nine European countries in November 2025.

== Style ==
Minami Deutsch have been characterized as krautrock, psychedelic, jazz, and space rock, while the band self-describe themselves as "repetition freaks", and cite psychedelic rock and minimal techno as their starting point. Their music mostly instrumental, occasionally featuring snippets of lyrics in Japanese or English. Pitchfork reviewer, Patrick St. Michel, appreciated the band's balance between revivalism and innovation. Michel added that both Dim With Light and the self-titled debut album focused on a particular period in krautrock history, reviving "the scene's primordial days", specifically the motorik rhythms of the first two Neu! albums. Zoé Richardet of Tages-Anzeiger compared Minami Deutsch to a Frankenstein's monster: "one exhumed half of its body is Krautrock, the other psychedelic rock from the seventies. And the current that generates the life-giving spark is the creative energy of Minami Deutsch."

When Kyotaro heard Krautrock bands like Can as a teenager, he "wasn't that impressed". At the time, he favored post-rock and post-punk.

== Members ==
- Kyotaro Miula – lead guitar, vocals, synthesiser
- Keita Ise – bass
- Kosei Terunuma – drums
- Taku Idemoto – guitar, drums

=== Former members ===
- Riki Hidaka – guitar
- Keisuke Ise – bass
- Takuya Nozaki – drums
- Tatsuhiko Rauschenberg – guitar

== Discography ==
=== Studio albums ===
- Minami Deutsch (2015, Cardinal Fuzz)
- With Dim Light (2018, Guruguru Brain)
- Fortune Goodies (2022, Guruguru Brain)

=== Live album ===
- Live At Roadburn Festival (Minami Deutsch and Damo Suzuki) (2019, Fuzz Club Records)

=== EPs ===
- Can't Get There EP (2019, Höga Nord Rekords)

=== Singles ===
- "Tunnel / New Pastoral Life" (2016, Höga Nord Rekords)
- "Minami Deutsch / Kuro" – "Boogie Down / Atlas Stabbed" (2018, God Unknown Records)
