= Saw Delight =

Studio album by Can
- Released: March 1977
- Recorded: January 1977
- Genres: Krautrock; world; disco
- Length: 37:29
- Labels: Harvest; Virgin
- Producer: Can

Can chronology
Flow Motion (1976)	Saw Delight (1977)	Out of Reach (1978)

Saw Delight is the eighth studio album by the German Krautrock band Can. It features two new band members who were ex-members of the band Traffic, Rosko Gee and Rebop Kwaku Baah, with Can's bassist Holger Czukay giving up the bass in favour of experimental effects.

== Background ==
On the eve of the recording sessions for Saw Delight, Can had a tumultuous creative atmosphere, marked by intensifying creative difference between Can members. They experienced escalating "tension between Can's free-form philosophy and the desire to sculpt accessible musical forms". The band members started drifting away from joined, lengthy recording sessions after the integration of sixteen-track recording in 1975. The new equipment allowed Can to record in isolation by providing them means for performing the audio tracks alone, separately from the core recording session, and overdubbing them in post-production. Lastly, the clarity of the sixteen-track recording "magnified" the musicians' flaws and "frequently criticised" these flaws, especially unhappy about the output of their bassist Holger Czukay.

Czukay had "taken up the bass in the group almost by default", and by early 1977, he drifted away from playing the bass due to the creative differences within the band. Additionally, Can's music increasingly took on more mainstream forms, and Czukay "had less of an outlet for his more experimental impulses". He stopped playing bass for Can, but continued working with the group, producing their records and modifying them with electronic effects. He later said that "they somehow wanted to achieve that Can became a good band of instrumentalists—that means heroes of their own instruments. I could not make it, actually."

When band was looking for a substitute bass player, Czukay introduced them to a former Traffic member, Rosko Gee. Czukay met him in 1975 during Can's performance on the episode of The Old Grey Whistle Test. At that time, Rosko was a part of Jim Capaldi's backing band, which performed his single "Love Hurts" on the same episode. Gee brought along his former bandmate, Reebop Kwaku Baah, who joined Can as the second percussionist.

Soon after the release of Can's previous record, Flow Motion, Michael Karoli set out on a trip to central and east Africa for a couple of weeks, traveling through the Congo, Zaïre, and Kenya". In 1997, Karoli told a journalist: "When you visit a nightclub in Africa where a good highlife band is playing, you feel like a carrot chucked into a boiling soup. You have to move… that influence was inevitable on Saw Delight". Rosko confirmed that "Michael's style of playing may have changed after his trip to Africa", and thought Michael became a better guitar player, comparing the aftermath of his trip to the revelation that hit George Harrison after his trip to India.

== Production ==
Saw Delight was mixed by Can at the Delta Acoustic Studio near Hamburg. The studio's sound engineer, Manfred Schunke, converted it into "Artificial Head Stereo, essaying a 3D effect that's 'hard to appreciate at four decades' distance". Michael Karoli described some of the passages on the album as "pure rhythm".

"Don't Say No" incorporates the melody from Can's earlier track "Moonshake".

The front cover "fuses an image of circular saw, long-player grooves, and mystical circle".

== Release and promotion ==
Saw Delight was released by EMI Records's subdivision Harvest Records in 1977. The reverse of the album sleeve, in the initial LP pressing, featured the original four members of Can plus Rosko Gee, arranged in a pentagram formation around a mandala. Although Reebop Kwaku Baah played on most of Saw Delight and was listed among the personnel in the inner bag, he was not included in the photo.

In support of the album, Can set off on a European tour that would prove to be their final sequence of concerts, one year before Can disbanded. They played without Reebop. The first concert was performed in Canterbury, UK, on 1 March, playing in UK until the end of the month, including dates in Keele, Aston University, Redcar's Coatham Bowl, Bournemouth Winter Gardens, and Nottingham, and two dates at London venue Sound Circus. In late April, the band played several German dates including Cologne with vocalist Manni Löhe.

== Critical reception ==
=== Contemporary ===
Melody Maker reviewer praised Saw Delight' "assurance and determination, absent (to my mind) on its predecessor". The album has "inviting and effervescent" African stylings, rejuvenated by "a communication of Can's optimism and their revived delight in their music".

Sounds' Giovanni Dadomo, on the other hand, was a scathingly critical: "I'm into representation, man. And Can's solo doodles over regular rhythms always make me think of a one year-old scrawling on a piece of graph paper… Unfortunately what ["Fly by Night"] entails is someone doing a weak impression of Kevin Ayers and being moreover so embarrassed by the thing that he's had to sellotape a wad of Kleenex over his mouth whilst doing it... It's a turkey."

=== Retrospective ===
Retrospective professional ratings
Review scores
Source	Rating
AllMusic	2.5/5 stars
The Encyclopedia of Popular Music	3/5 stars
(The New) Rolling Stone Album Guide	2/5 stars

Stewart Mason, writing for AllMusic, lauded the band's experiments with Afro-Cuban jazz, but was disappointed execution on Saw Delight. Mason expected "polyrhythmic fireworks from a drum duel" between Baah and the African-influenced Jaki Liebezeit, but instead Liebezeit, Can's core drummer, "basically rolls over keeping time with simple beats while the percussionist takes on the hard work". Mason, however, liked Rosko Gee's performance, adding "an almost Mingus-like rhythmic intensity to even the loosest songs". He praised "Don't Say No", with its "controlled fury" reminding him of earlier Can, and favored side-two tracks, "Animal Waves" and "Fly by Night". He was unimpressed by two lengthy tracks ("Call Me" and "Sunshine Day and Night"). In conclusion, Mason generally felt there was a "tired, somewhat dispirited vibe to the whole album that makes it an unsatisfying send-off to Can's career".

(The New) Rolling Stone Album Guide, published in 2004, enjoyed the "curious disco experiments" on Saw Delight, highlighting a long instrumental jam "Animal Waves" and Czukay's experiments with a shortwave receiver, but concluded that the album had a noticeable smell of "desperation for crossover success", and thought it did not suit Can.

== Track listing ==
Side one
No.	Title	Lyrics	Music	Length
1.	"Don't Say No"	Peter Gilmour	Czukay, Karoli, Liebezeit, Schmidt, Gee, Baah	6:36
2.	"Sunshine Day and Night"	none	Czukay, Karoli, Liebezeit, Schmidt, Gee	5:52
3.	"Call Me"	Rosko Gee	Czukay, Karoli, Liebezeit, Schmidt, Gee	5:51

Side two
No.	Title	Lyrics	Music	Length
1.	"Animal Waves"	none	Czukay, Karoli, Liebezeit, Schmidt, Gee, Baah	15:29
2.	"Fly by Night"	Peter Gilmour	Czukay, Karoli, Liebezeit, Schmidt, Gee	4:08

== Personnel ==
Can

- Holger Czukay – wave receiver, spec. sounds, vocals on 1
- Michael Karoli – guitar, electric violin, vocals on 1, 5
- Jaki Liebezeit – drums, vocals on 1
- Irmin Schmidt – keyboard, Alpha 77, vocals on 1
- Rosko Gee – bass, vocals on 1, 3
- Reebop Kwaku Baah – percussion, vocals on 1

== Works cited ==
- Young, Rob; Schmidt, Irmin (2018). All Gates Open: The Story of Can (e-book ed.). London: Faber and Faber. ISBN 978-0-571-31151-4.
