= Can (album) =

Studio album by Can
- Released: July 1979
- Recorded: February 1978
- Genre: Krautrock; disco; reggae
- Length: 39:41
- Label: Harvest; Laser
- Producer: Can

Can chronology
Out of Reach (1978)	Can (1979)	Delay 1968 (1981)

Singles from Can
- 1. "Can-Can" Released: 1978

Can, also known as Inner Space, is the tenth studio album by German krautrock band Can, released in 1979 by Harvest Records (Germany) and Laser Records (UK). It was Can's last studio release before the reunion album Rite Time (1989), and it was released after the band's break-up.

Holger Czukay, former Can's bassist, had a limited involvement with this album focused on tape editing.

== Recording and production ==
Can was recorded in February 1978 at Inner Space Studios in Weilerswist, near Cologne, and mixed at Hansa Tonstudio in Berlin.

"Aspectacle" was commissioned as theme tune by ZDF's arts review programme Aspekte in 1978, when the show was given an overhaul in an attempt to open it to a wider public. They recorded a funky sixteen-beat shuffle, and Can (including Holger Czukay playing a set of pan pipes) were filmed playing the track at Inner Space. A six-minute version of "Aspectacle", complete with vocals by Rosko Gee, appeared on Can LP. "Ethnological Forgery Series No. 99 Can Can" is a "bonkers reading" of Jacques Offenbach's "Infernal Galop", from his 1858 opera Orpheus in the Underworld, popularly known as the melody for the Can-can dance. Additionally, it is one of the last songs from the band's long-running "EFS" series, aimed at cultivating compositions inspired by world music.

The album cover features the band's name compressed into a "hexagonal nut that is being raised aloft to the heavens in the embrace of a spanner".

== Music and lyrics ==
When compared to the previous two albums, the production on Can is cleaner, more spacious, and the sound engineer René Tinner became more experienced at accommodating the extra elements brought in by Reebop Kwaku Baah, keeping his contributions lower in the mix. Rosko Gee's bass is much more character similar to Holger Czukay's early-seventies work.

The opening track "All Gates Open" features "simplified yet muscular" drum groove, unexpected rootsiness brought in by harmonica, and Robert Fripp-inspired guitar. The song sounds "majestic, dignified, even triumphant". On the lyrical side, the phrase "all gates open" can be interpreted in two distinct ways; when the gates are open, things can both "slip outwards as well as be allowed in", which essentially reflecting on the state of Can's creative direction during the early part of 1978.

The sound of "Safe" sends back to the "mystery of the early Can tracks, where something powerful is being invoked, although its rules of engagement are still obscure". Jaki's drums and Rosko's bass are paired up in a much more integrated fashion, compared to the two previous albums. The vocals on "Safe" are processed through a vocoder. Rob Young, Can's biographer, noted that "like the best Can tracks, this is a dynamo which could go on forever if it was left to run by itself.

"Sunday Jam" is described as a "rainbow glide", which draws influence from African music with hints of the famous jazz standard "Caravan". The electric "Sodom" has been compared to the music of the electronic duo Cluster, blues guitarist Jimi Hendrix, and German composer Karlheinz Stockhausen. The closer track "Can Be" is called a 'scintillating attempt at R&B fusion", diverging into epic "big hair arena corpo-rock territory, held together by Karoli's excellent playing".

== Release ==
Can was released in 1979 by Harvest Records in Germany and by Laser Records in United Kingdom. Can was reissued as Legendary Can in 1999 with additional tracks.

== Critical reception ==
Professional retrospective reviews
Review scores
Source	Rating
AllMusic	2.5/5 stars
The Encyclopedia of Popular Music	2/5 stars
(The New) Rolling Stone Album Guide	3.5/5 stars
Spin Alternative Record Guide	6/10

AllMusic's Michael G. Nastos, but feeling less enthusiastic about "Sodom" and "Can Can", calling the former "plodding" and the later "campy". (The New) Rolling Stone Album Guide, however, found "Can Can" to be a "hilarious cover" of Jacques Offenbach's "Infernal Galop". Irmin Schmidt, Can's synth player, added that "Offenbach would have liked it. He had a feel for the vulgar."

Rob Young, Can's biographer, concluded that the album "sounds far more unclenched than the previous album, and to a certain extent it picks up where Landed left off". Nastos, as well as the Rolling Stone guide, praised the record for exceeding their expectation and firmly concluding the initial incarnation of Can.

== Track listing ==
Side one
No.	Title	Writer(s)	Length
1.	"All Gates Open"	Karoli, Liebezeit, Schmidt, Gee, Baah	8:23
2.	"Safe"	Karoli, Liebezeit, Schmidt, Gee, Baah	8:37
3.	"Sunday Jam"	Karoli, Liebezeit, Schmidt, Gee	4:35

Side two
No.	Title	Writer(s)	Length
4.	"Sodom"	Karoli, Liebezeit, Schmidt	5:45
5.	"Aspectacle"	Czukay, Karoli, Liebezeit, Schmidt, Gee	5:53
6.	"E.F.S. Nr. 99 (Can Can)" (Originally from Jacques Offenbach's opera Orpheus in the Underworld)	Offenbach, arr. by Karoli, Liebezeit, Schmidt	3:12
7.	"Ping-Pong"	Trad. arr. by Karoli, Liebezeit, Schmidt	0:23
8.	"Can Be"	Karoli, Liebezeit, Schmidt	2:54

== Personnel ==
Credits adapted from Can album liner notes.

Can

- Michael Karoli – guitar, vocals; bass on "Can Be"
- Irmin Schmidt – keyboards
- Rosko Gee – bass
- Jaki Liebezeit – drums
- Rebop Kwaku Baah – percussion

Production

- Can – producers
- René Tinner – recording-engineer
- Eduard Meyer – sound-engineer
- Holger Czukay – editing
- Dirk Weber – art direction
- Arke – cover photo
- Werbegruppe Kochlowski – cover design
