= Zahara (band) =

Jazz band

- Genres: Jazz fusion; World music; Electronic
- Years active: 1982-1983
- Labels: Antilles Records
- Members: Reebop Kwaku Baah; Paul Delph; Bryson Graham; Rosko Gee

Zahara was a jazz fusion ensemble that included Reebop Kwaku Baah (percussion), Paul Delph (keyboards), Bryson Graham (drums), and Rosko Gee (bass).

Zahara released only one album, Flight of The Spirit (1983), published by the Antilles Records. The members of Zahara came from different cultural backgrounds (United States, United Kingdom, South Africa, and Jamaica), which influenced the elements of Flight of The Spirit, They blending jazz, world music, and electronic music.

Shortly after the band recorded the album in 1982, Reebop died, and Zahara ultimately disbanded.
