= All Gates Open =

2018 book by Rob Young and Irmin Schmidt

All Gates Open: The Story of Can
- First edition book cover
- Authors: Rob Young and Irmin Schmidt
- Language: English
- Subject: Can
- Genre: Biography
- Publisher: Faber and Faber
- Publication date: 3 May 2018
- Publication place: United Kingdom
- Media type: Print (hardcover)
- Pages: 592
- ISBN: 978-0-571-31149-1

All Gates Open: The Story of Can is a book about the German experimental rock band Can, written by British writer and editor Rob Young and Can founding member Irmin Schmidt. It was published in May 2018 in the United Kingdom by Faber and Faber in two editions, a trade edition in hardback, and a handbound and autographed limited edition. (Note: The limited edition of the book was numbered and autographed by Rob Young and Irmin Schmidt. It was printed on wood-free paper, handbound and includes a 78-page Can studio notebook. Only 200 copies of this edition were printed and it was restricted to purchasers in the United Kingdom and Ireland.)

All Gates Open consists of two parts, a biography of Can by Young, and a collage of interviews, conversations, and extracts from notebooks and journals by Schmidt. The book was generally well received by critics.

== Synopsis ==
All Gates Open: The Story of Can consists of two parts, Book One: All Gates Open by Rob Young, and Book Two: Can Kiosk by Irmin Schmidt.

Book One is a biography of Can. Using interviews with Can's members and people associated the band, Young traces the history of the band from their formation in 1967 in Cologne, Germany by Schmidt with Holger Czukay, Michael Karoli and Jaki Liebezeit, to their split in 1979. He covers their work, from their studio albums and live performances, to their film soundtracks and their "Ethnological Forgery Series" world music. Young also explains the role they played in the development of Krautrock and the influence they had on other musicians. The effect post-war Germany had on its youth and the resulting music scenes that developed in the 1950s and 60s is also investigated.

Book Two is a collection of documents collated by Schmidt. It contains an oral history of Can assembled by Electronic Beats editor Max Dax and writer/producer Robert Defcon, and interviews by Schmidt with other musicians, artists and filmmakers. The interviews, which include The Fall's Mark E. Smith, Bobby Gillespie of Primal Scream and German filmmaker Wim Wenders, were cut up and reassembled as a roundtable discussion. Also incorporated in the book are extracts from Schmidt's notebooks and journals from 2013 to 2014, which include dream fragments and his memories of Germany immediately after World War II.

== Title ==
The title of the book was taken from the song "All Gates Open" on Can's 1979 album, Can. This was their last album before the band split, and Young said the lyrics of the song suggested they were "constructing their own epitaph". Czukay explained in a May 1979 article he wrote about the band in Perfect Sound Forever that the title of that song was indicative of their frame of mind at the time: "All gates really came open [sic] for each member of the band going their own musical way which everyone had dreamed of".

== Reception ==
Brooklyn Rail arts journal music editor George Grella called All Gates Open "a fascinating narrative of how [Can's] imagination, commitment, and preparation" produced a blend of "post-Schoenberg European classical avant-garde, anarchic rock in the spirit of the Velvet Underground, and idiomatic free improvisation." He felt that in some respects, Young "had it easy" – in contrast to other rock bands, Can's story "is unique" filled with "chance happenings" with "a near supernatural feel". Grella remarked that Young's explanation of how important Malcolm Mooney and Damo Suzuki's singing was to the band "is a revealing mind-changer". Comparing All Gates Open to other works on Can, Grella opined that it is "[m]ore comprehensive" than Future Days: Krautrock and the Building of Modern Germany by David Stubbs, and "more satisfying" than The Can Book by Pascal Bussy and Andy Hall.

In a review in The Guardian, music critic Kitty Empire called All Gates Open "a cerebral book about a cerebral band". She said Young's knowledge of Can and their Inner Space studio "runs deep", and his coverage of the band's musical output is impressive. But Empire did complain that from time to time Young does "wax a little too eloquent". For example he described "Yoo Doo Right" from Monster Movie as "'a squadron of mechanical deities manoeuvring through a ravine' to be 'extruded' and 'fractalised into an ever-shifting array of byways'". Empire said one weakness of Young's portion of the book is that it is told largely from a single point of view, and felt that not enough attention is given to the "idiosyncratic personalities" associated with Can. She found Schmidt's contribution interesting, the way the content is presented as a collage, imitating Can's approach to their music. But she did feel some of it is a little excessive at times, particularly Schmidt's dreams and his conversations with neighbours.

Writing in PopMatters, John Garratt said Young gives a detailed account of Can's early years, including all their successes and failures. He added that as Can "is not your ordinary rock band", this biography is not "your typical rock 'n' roll biography", and the many diversions in the book could deter the average reader. Schmidt's notebook and journal entries often have little to do with the band – Schmidt told Mark E. Smith of The Fall the book is "less about Can and more a book about music and being an artist". Garratt said that if Schmidt's notebooks were not quite so detached from the rest of the biography, he would call All Gates Open "a perfect book to capture an imperfect band". But he added that if you "take it all at its intended best ... you'll find that it's still wholly worth it." Garratt rated the book 8/10 stars.

== Works cited ==
- Young, Rob; Schmidt, Irmin (2018). All Gates Open: The Story of Can (e-book ed.). London: Faber and Faber. ISBN 978-0-571-31151-4.
