= I Want More (Can song) =

- Cover of the 2006 re-release

Single by Can

from the album Flow Motion
- B-side: "... And More"
- Released: 1976
- Recorded: Inner Space Studio, Cologne
- Genre: Progressive rock; disco
- Length: 3:37
- Label: Virgin Records
- Songwriter(s): Can, Peter Gilmour
- Producer(s): Can

Music video
- Can - I Want More (Official Audio) on YouTube

"I Want More" is a song by German rock band Can. It was released as a single in July 1976 and later included on Can's 1976 album Flow Motion. Unusually, it features all members of the band on vocals simultaneously and is characteristic of their Virgin era sound, with lyrics written by Peter Gilmour.

It was the band's only hit single in the UK, peaking at #26, which led to an appearance on Top of the Pops where Holger Czukay mimed a performance on double bass.

The single was reissued on its 30th anniversary in 2006 by Spoon Records and reached number 103 in the UK Singles Chart in June. The single was released on a 7" picture disc, on 12" orange vinyl (limited copy pressing) and in digital download format.

"... And More", also on Flow Motion, repeats the chorus of the track and was included as a B-side to the single release.

== Other versions ==
The song was covered by Australian band GBVG (an alias of the Underground Lovers) in 1998 and became an indie hit.

A 1987 cover version by Finitribe featured Chris Connelly on vocals.

A cover by Richard H. Kirk of Cabaret Voltaire appeared on the Earlier/Later - Unreleased Projects Anthology 74-89 album.

The British synthpop band Blancmange covered the song on their fifth studio album Semi Detached in 2015.
