= Delay 1968 =

1981 compilation album by Can

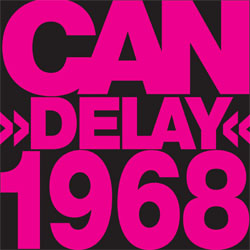

Compilation album by Can
- Released: 1981
- Recorded: 1968–1969
- Genres: Krautrock; psychedelic rock
- Length: 35:48
- Label: Spoon
- Producer: Can

Can chronology
Can (1979)	Delay 1968 (1981)	Rite Time (1989)

Professional ratings
Review scores
Source	Rating
Allmusic	3/5 stars
Encyclopedia of Popular Music	3/5 stars
The Rolling Stone Album Guide	4/5 stars

Delay 1968 is an album by the German experimental rock band Can released in 1981. It comprises previously unreleased work recorded for Can's rejected debut album, Prepared to Meet Thy Pnoom.

== Background ==
Recorded with the group's original lead singer Malcolm Mooney, Can offered Prepared to Meet Thy Pnoom to several record companies, but the album was not picked up. Parts of Delay 1968 circulated in bootleg form for several years under the title Unopened, and included other tracks recorded during the same sessions that would later surface in various forms on other albums.

Can recorded the song "Thief" in the summer of 1969 during a stay in Zurich. The band visited Zurich after receiving an invitation to perform a live score for the play Prometheus Bound at the Schauspielhaus Zürich, and recorded "Thief" in the theater's cellar "with awful acoustics". Rob Young, Can's biographer, commented that the song finds Can at their "most gravitas-laden" with the subject matter "riffing directly off the scenography of Prometheus Bound", referencing "the hanging man", "the Jesus man … cursed to the holy ground" and "trying to fly". "Thief" was used in the comedy thriller Kuckucksei im Gangsternest, directed by Franz-Josef Spieker and released at the end of the year. The song was first released on Electric Rock. Idee 2000 sampler album from Liberty records as around six minutes long edit.

The song "Uphill", sometimes called "Moving Slowly Going Uphill", was live recorded during an open doors event at the Schloss Nörvenich in August 1969. Can were invited to set up a performance in the Schloss' entrance hall, where Malcolm Mooney "became distracted, hypnotised even, by the constant flow of visitors up and down the central staircase", tirelessly repeating the words "Moving Slowly Going Uphill". According to Can legend, he recited the phrase "Upstairs … downstairs … upstairs … downstairs …" over and over, speaking it obsessively "until he became locked into a mania of repetition" and did not stop when the group took a break.

"Little Star of Bethlehem" is one of the first recordings with inserted overdub parts of the entire band. When German producer Conny Plank listened to the recordings in the early 1980s, he got excited saying: "As long as Can plays 'Soul' they are unbeatable".

== Reception and legacy ==
The Rolling Stone Album Guide included a review of Delay 1968, writing that the album is "so good it's hard to believe it stayed in the can for another 13 years". The most "raucous and insistent record, with Karoli riffing harder than he ever would again, and Mooney's hoarse, off-key cries suiting its avant-garage vibe."

Jason Ankeny of AllMusic gave the album mixed reception, calling it "nowhere near as intricate or assured as the group's later work". However, he praised "the visceral energy" of "Uphill" and "Butterfly".

Brian Eno made a remix of "PNOOM" for 1997 Can tribute album Sacrilege, with substantial use of loops. Eno was disappointed with his effort, saying the loops "destroyed the delicate balance you always kept between the mechanical and the human".

Radiohead covered "Thief" in live performances in the early 2000s.

== Track listing ==
All tracks are written by Czukay, Karoli, Liebezeit, Schmidt, Mooney.

Side one
No.	Title	Length
1.	"Butterfly"	8:20
2.	"Pnoom"	0:26
3.	"Nineteen Century Man"	4:26
4.	"Thief"	5:03

Side two
No.	Title	Length
5.	"Man Named Joe"	3:54
6.	"Uphill"	6:41
7.	"Little Star of Bethlehem"	7:09
Total length:		35:48

== Personnel ==
=== Original recordings ===
- Holger Czukay – bass guitar
- Michael Karoli – guitar
- Jaki Liebezeit – drums, percussion, saxophone
- Irmin Schmidt – keyboards, Cristal Baschet
- Malcolm Mooney – vocals

=== Delay 1968 ===
- Irmin Schmidt and Holger Czukay - mastering
