= Monster Movie (Can album) =

1968 album by Can

Studio album by the Can
- Released: August 1969
- Recorded: July 1969
- Studios: Schloss Nörvenich (Nörvenich, West Germany)
- Genres: Krautrock; psychedelic rock; space rock
- Length: 38:05
- Labels: Music Factory; Liberty
- Producer: Can

The Can chronology
Monster Movie (1969)	Soundtracks (1970)

Original cover
- 1969 Music Factory issue

Monster Movie is the debut studio album by the German krautrock band Can, released in August 1969 by Music Factory and subsequently Liberty Records.

== Background and recording ==
In 1968, Can recorded an album entitled Prepared to Meet Thy PNOOM, which no record company agreed to release (these recordings were eventually released in 1981 as Delay 1968). Monster Movie was the group's subsequent attempt at a more commercial record. The album is credited to "The Can", a name suggested by vocalist Malcolm Mooney and adopted by democratic vote. The band had previously been known as "Inner Space", which later became the name of their recording studio. Some copies of the LP bore the subtitle "Made in a castle with better equipment", referring to Schloss Nörvenich, the 14th-century castle in Nörvenich, North Rhine-Westphalia, where the band recorded Monster Movie and its successors Soundtracks (1970) and Tago Mago (1971).

Monster Movie was mastered at the Westdeutscher Rundfunk's Studio for Electronic Music in Cologne by Can's bassist and engineer Holger Czukay, a former student of composer Karlheinz Stockhausen.

=== Artwork ===
The image on the cover is a retrace of the Marvel Comics character Galactus, as originally depicted by Jack Kirby (inked by Vince Colletta) in Marvel's Thor #134 (on page 3) in 1966.

The original Music Factory pressing's sleeve art, produced by the label and designed by artist Helge Bauch, features a large orange circle against a white background containing a printmaking drawing. The head of the Music Factory, Karlheinz Freynik, described the drawing as "mystical from Greek myths that fits to the music". Rob Young, Can's biographer, saw a naked old man on the drawing "peering into what looks like the flaming portal of hell. He is surrounded by demons and a goat-headed man gnawing on a limb".

== Composition ==
"Father Cannot Yell"
Sound sample of the opening track

Monster Movie brings together elements of psychedelic rock, blues, free jazz, world music and other styles, the influence of the Velvet Underground being particularly obvious on the opening track "Father Cannot Yell". The use of improvisation, experimentation, tape editing and layering of sounds set a standard for Can's subsequent albums in the early 1970s, which helped form the style labeled "krautrock" by the British music press. The 20-minute closing track "Yoo Doo Right" was edited down from six hours of improvisation. The lyrics of "Mary, Mary So Contrary" are based on the English nursery rhyme "Mary, Mary, Quite Contrary".

Monster Movie was the last Can album on which Malcolm Mooney performed all of the vocals until Rite Time, recorded in late 1986 and issued in 1989.

== Release and reception ==
Professional ratings
Review scores
Source	Rating
AllMusic	4.5/5 stars
The Encyclopedia of Popular Music	4/5 stars
The Great Rock Discography	7/10
Pitchfork	8.7/10
The Rolling Stone Album Guide	4/5 stars
Spectrum Culture	5/5
Spin Alternative Record Guide	7/10
Stylus Magazine	A

Monster Movie initially came out in late August 1969 on the small German label Music Factory. As part of his contract with the band, label head Kalle Freynik had a goal to "promote the product as good as the label can, and when there's any reaction the label will try to get it on a major label". The initial pressing was five hundred copies, distributed by Freynik "in carefully selected head shops and underground shops to boost the band's reputation by word of mouth". The first pressing quickly sold out, and Freynik subsequently signed a deal with Liberty Records/United Artists. Liberty's issue of the album was released in May 1970 with an updated cover.

In a contemporary review Richard Williams of Melody Maker identified a significant Velvet Underground influence on the album's shorter tracks, but admitted "they have a lot of themselves to offer, mainly in the field of electronics, which they use with sparing brilliance, and the interplay between the Morse-code organ and the machine-gun drums on "You Do Right" [sic] is extremely startling". Williams praised Mooney's performance, stating that his "wailing and screaming fits perfectly where a less reticent singer would obtrude. In fact they use another of the Velvets' favourite tricks, putting the voice beneath the instruments so that it tantalises the listener unbearably."

The retrospective BBC review by Mike Barnes also commended "Yoo Doo Right", opining that it set up a platform for Can's future explorations.

== Track listing ==
All tracks are written by Can (Holger Czukay, Michael Karoli, Jaki Liebezeit, Irmin Schmidt, and Malcolm Mooney).

Side one
No.	Title	Length
1.	"Father Cannot Yell"	7:06
2.	"Mary, Mary So Contrary"	6:22
3.	"Outside My Door"	4:11

Side two
No.	Title	Length
4.	"Yoo Doo Right"	20:27
Total length:		38:06

== Personnel ==
Can

- Irmin Schmidt – keyboards
- Jaki Liebezeit – drums
- Holger Czukay – bass guitar
- Michael Karoli – electric guitar
- Malcolm Mooney – vocals, harmonica
