= Rebop Kwaku Baah =

Ghanaian musician (1944–1983)

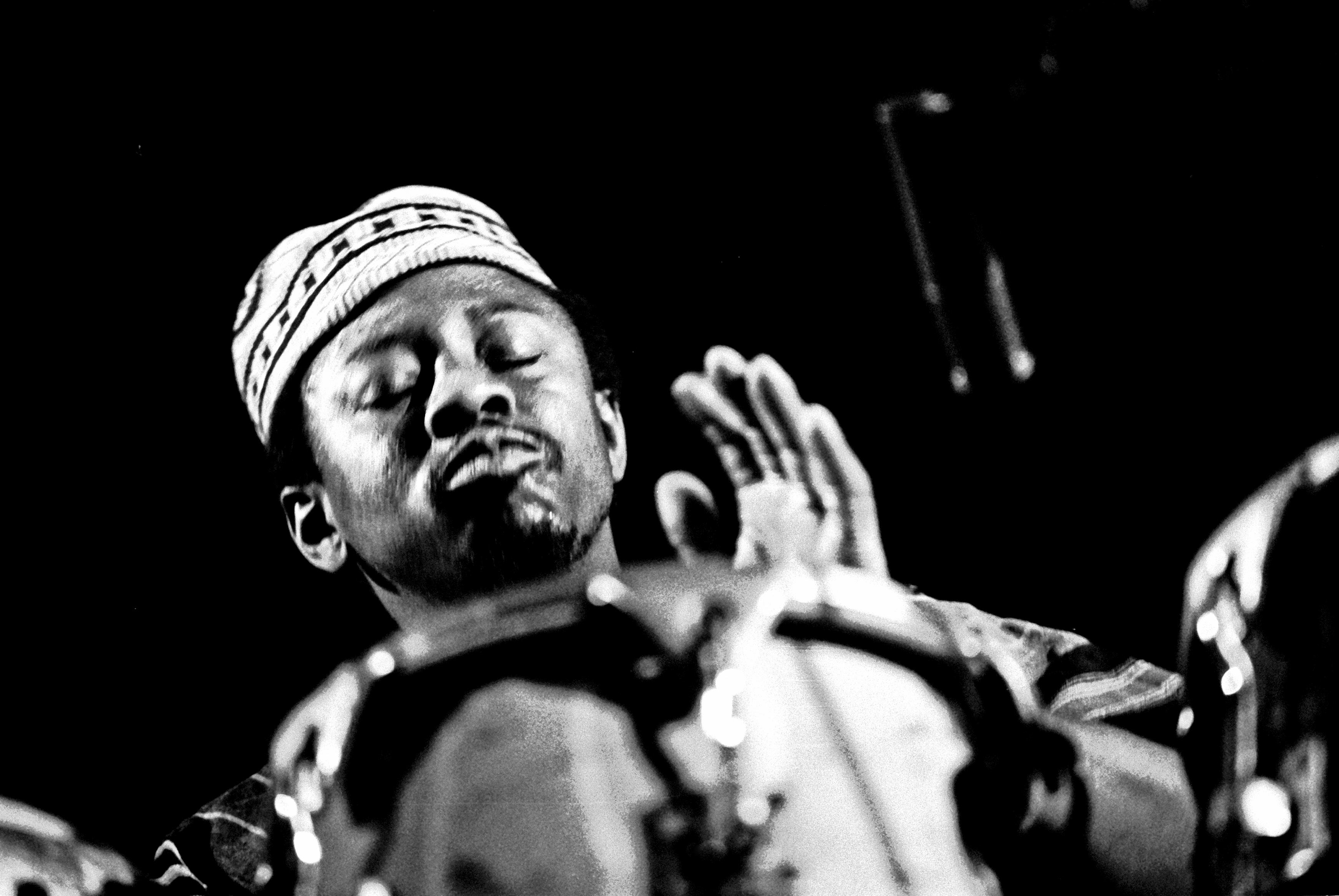
- Baah performing with Traffic in 1973, Musikhalle Hamburg

Background information
- Also known as: Reebop Kwaku Baah
- Born: Anthony Kwaku Baah; 13 February 1944; Konongo, Gold Coast
- Died: 12 January 1983 (aged 38) Stockholm, Sweden
- Genres: Rock and roll; jazz fusion
- Occupation: Percussionist
- Formerly of: Traffic; Can; Zahara

Anthony "Rebop" Kwaku Baah (13 February 1944 – 12 January 1983) was a Ghanaian percussionist who worked with the 1970s rock groups Traffic and Can.

== Biography ==
Baah was born in 1944 in Konongo, Gold Coast. In the Akan culture of Ghana, Kwaku is a name meaning "male born on Wednesday".

In 1969, Baah performed on Randy Weston's album African Rhythms. In the same year he worked with Nick Drake on the song "Three Hours", posthumously released in 2004 on the compilation album Made to Love Magic. He then joined the English band Traffic in 1971, having met them in Sweden during a tour. He appeared on the albums Welcome to the Canteen, The Low Spark of High Heeled Boys, Shoot Out at the Fantasy Factory, On the Road, and When the Eagle Flies.

In 1973, he performed in the all-star Eric Clapton's Rainbow Concert. After Traffic disbanded in 1974, he played on Steve Winwood’s self-titled debut solo album, which was released in 1977. Also in 1977, he joined the German band Can along with former Traffic bassist Rosko Gee, playing with them until their breakup in 1979, appearing on the albums Saw Delight, Out of Reach and Can.

In 1982, Baah recorded an album with Zahara. Baah died of a cerebral hemorrhage during a performance in Stockholm, Sweden, in January 1983, where he was on tour with Jimmy Cliff. His final album, Melodies in a Jungle Man's Head, was released in its unfinished state.

== Discography ==
=== Solo ===
- Reebop (1972)
- Anthony Reebop Kwaku Baah (1973)
- Trance (1977; with Ganoua musicians)
- Melodies in a Jungle Man's Head (1983)

=== With Traffic ===
- Welcome to the Canteen (1971)
- The Low Spark of High Heeled Boys (1971)
- Shoot Out at the Fantasy Factory (1973)
- On the Road (1973)
- When the Eagle Flies (1974; initially uncredited. Credited in remastered edition booklet.)

=== With Can ===
- Saw Delight (1977)
- Out of Reach (1978)
- Can (1979)

=== With others ===
- Out Of The Frying Pan - Wynder K. Frog (1968; credited as "Reebop")
- African Cookbook – Randy Weston (1969)
- Oh How We Danced – Jim Capaldi (1972)
- Eric Clapton's Rainbow Concert – Eric Clapton (1973)
- Heartbreaker – Free (1973; played congas on "Wishing Well")
- Goats Head Soup – Rolling Stones (1973)
- Men Opening Umbrellas Ahead – Vivian Stanshall (1974)
- Short Cut Draw Blood – Jim Capaldi (1974)
- A Funky Thide of Sings – Billy Cobham (1975)
- Steve Winwood – Steve Winwood (1977)
- Get Into What You're In – Lee Vanderbilt (1977)
- Movies – Holger Czukay (1979; played organ on "Cool in the Pool")
- "Masimba Bele" – The Unknown Cases (1983)
- Flight Of The Spirit – Zahara (1983)
- Filmmusik Vol. 3 & 4 – Irmin Schmidt (1983)
- Cuba – The Unknown Cases (1983)
- Colours and Soul – Dunkelziffer (1983; credited as "Reebop")
- Echoes – Wally Badarou (1984; played on "Jungle")
