= Rite Time =

1989 album by the German krautrock band Can

Studio album by Can
- Released: Late summer 1989
- Recorded: December 1986
- Studio: The Outer Space
- Genres: Krautrock, reggae
- Length: 41:52
- Labels: Mercury; Spoon (through Mute)
- Producers: Michael Karoli, Holger Czukay

Can chronology
Delay 1968 (1981)	Rite Time (1989)

Rite Time is the eleventh and final studio album by the German krautrock band Can, released in late Summer 1989 by Mercury Records. The album features the vocals of the band's original singer, Malcolm Mooney, who had left the group in 1970 after their debut album Monster Movie. Upon the album's initial release, "In the Distance Lies the Future" only appeared on the CD version, but it was included on the 2014 vinyl reissue.

Rite Time consists of sessions recorded at the Outer Space studio in December 1986, mixed at the Can Studio in 1988, and edited at Holger's "Lab for Degenerated Music" in 1989.

== Background ==
Can's reunion project was proposed by both Malcolm Mooney (Can's early vocalist) and Hildegard Schmidt (Can's record label manager). The recording took place in the Outer Space studio set up by the band's guitarist Michael Karoli in his house built near Nice, Southern France. The project was sponsored by production company Fink & Star, founded by George Reinhart—art patron and a nephew of the wealthy Swiss art collector Oskar Reinhart. "Fink & Star" previously financed the work of the Spoon Records and Irmin's LPs Musk at Dusk and Impossible Holidays. Fink & Star's resources paid for the musicians, technicians, travel costs, accommodation, and studio time.

== Recording and production ==
Rite Time consists of sessions recorded in the Outer Space studio, starting "just after Thanksgiving" in 1986 and finishing in December. It was mixed by Michael, Holger, and René Tinner at Weilerswist's Can Studio in 1988. The next year, before the album was delivered for release, Holger performed last edits at the "Lab for Degenerated Music", the room at his Cologne apartment. Malcolm told Rob Young, Can's biographer, they recorded a set of sixteen-minute takes, and out of these thirty-three minute take they conceived Rite Time. One of Malcolm's favourite compositions wasn't included into the final version. With Hildegard's permission, Malcolm included the composition on his vinyl release of The Sound of White Columns (2012), released by White Columns Gallery in New York.

At the time of the Rite Time sessions, writers Duncan Fallowell and Simon Puxley spent time with Can. Fallowell remembered the sessions as chaotic, "if one was there or not there, it didn't seem to affect the fact that life would continue. People would drop in … this ongoing thing." Jaki Liebezeit called their time as "not a good working atmosphere there, it was a holiday atmosphere. [Everybody] would prefer to eat something there and have a nice time. But there was not a group feeling."

A number of tracks include a background chorus, occasionally featuring Hildegard and Shirley (Michael Karoli's spouse). On "Below This Level (Patient's Song)", Malcolm reflects on his mental breakdown and his experience in a psychiatric ward in the late 60s.

== Music ==
Rite Time' composition was influenced by the stylistic changes in the individual output of Can members. "Give the Drummer Some" represents a more funkier and Liebezeit-centered side of Can, while "In the Distance Lies the Future" is more abstractly ambient Schmidt-powered composition. "Hoolah Hoolah" reveals a funnier side of Can, where Mooney takes the old schoolyard rhyme about how they don't wear pants on the other side of France as the jumping-off point for its melody and lyrics. "On the Beautiful Side of a Romance" finds the band in a mellow mood, complete with conventionally-soulful vocals from Mooney.

== Reception ==
Professional ratings
Review scores
Source	Rating
AllMusic	3/5 stars
The Encyclopedia of Popular Music	3/5 stars
Hi-Fi News & Record Review	A:1
The Rolling Stone Album Guide	1.5/5 stars

AllMusic reviewer Stewart Mason enjoyed the band's desire to make an album independent from the sound they created over the past two decades. Instead, they created a "document of where they're at musically at the time". Mason assessed it as "solidly listenable". Although Rite Time doesn't have the "rubbery, polyrhythmic intensity of classic Can albums, but it's a unlike the majority of reunion albums, doesn't soil the memory of the band". Pete Clark, writing for Hi-Fi News & Record Review, thought the album was "eminently listenable" with a mix of "straight songs illuminated by leaks or flashes of odd sound". He highlighted "Below This Level (Patient's Song)" or "Hoolah Hoolah".

The Rolling Stone Album Guide, published in 2004, called Rite Time skippable, capturing the spirit of Can and "not embarrassing, but the old magic is absent". The guide criticized Mooney "bellowing away without much relevance to what the band is playing".

Irmin Schmidt thought the album was disappointing, saying "it's not very new. We didn't invent a new Can. When we started, I thought this will be a chance for a new Can. But Rite Time is a Can record like any one before. It's nothing surprising. Not that I dislike the record – it's OK, and there are some nice pieces on there, but it's just a good record." Schmidt, however, had "Below This Level". Michael Karoli reminisced warmly about their reunion with Malcolm Mooney, but added that "there were a lot of fights. It was [actually] the wrong time." Holger Czukay, on the other hand, remembered as "a typical, not a youngster's, a beginner's work, but a good work and there is no need to be ashamed of it."

Rog Young, Can's biographer assessed that the album "didn't sound exactly like any previous Can album and landed like a gleaming UFO among the other alternative music appearing in 1989." Young highlighted the drums sounding "beefy and widely separated", the space between instruments clearly defined with digital effects, and the "corona of brightness" flooding tying the entirety of the record together. The production, however, saved from becoming too pristine by Malcolm's "sandpapery, confident holler".

== Track listing ==
All tracks are written by Czukay, Karoli, Liebezeit, Schmidt, Mooney.

No.	Title	Length
1.	"On the Beautiful Side of a Romance"	7:27
2.	"The Withoutlaw Man"	4:18
3.	"Below This Level (Patient's Song)"	3:44
4.	"Movin' Right Along"	3:28
5.	"Like a New Child"	7:36
6.	"Hoolah Hoolah"	4:31
7.	"Give the Drummer Some"	6:47
8.	"In the Distance Lies the Future" (appears only on the CD version of the album and later vinyl reissues)	4:00
Total length:		41:52

== Personnel ==
Can

- Malcolm Mooney – lead vocals
- Michael Karoli – guitar, chorus vocals, pocket organ, bass, production, mix
- Irmin Schmidt – keyboards, kalimba
- Holger Czukay – bass, French horn, synthesizer, dictaphone, production, mix
- Jaki Liebezeit – drums, percussion
- Hildegard Schmidt and Shirley - backing vocals

=== Production ===
- Patrick Jauneaud – recording
- René Tinner – mix
- Werner O. Richter – art direction
- Alfred Steffen – photographer (back cover photo)
