= Rosko Gee =

Jamaican bassist

Rosko Gee is a Jamaican bassist, who has played with the English band Traffic on their album When the Eagle Flies (1974); with Go featuring Stomu Yamashta, Steve Winwood, Michael Shrieve, Klaus Schulze and Al Di Meola; and with the German band Can, along with former Traffic percussionist Rebop Kwaku Baah, appearing on the albums Saw Delight, Out of Reach and Can. He toured with Can in 1977 and also provided vocals for some of the band's songs during this period.

After the breakup of Traffic in 1974, he played in the Johnny Nash band, Sons of the Jungle.

In 1983, he recorded an album with Zahara, a group with several notable members including Rebop Kwaku Baah (percussion), Paul Delph (keyboards) and Bryson Graham (drums).

In 1994, he rejoined Traffic for a reunion tour that included performances opening for the Grateful Dead which later yielded the live album The Last Great Traffic Jam (2005).

He played bass in the house band of Harald Schmidt's various late night TV shows on German television from 1996 to 2014.

His band Rosko Gee & The Hooded Ones released its first single in January 2015.
