= Can (band) =

German experimental rock band

- Can c. 1972; From left: Karoli, Schmidt, Czukay, Liebezeit, Suzuki

Background information
- Origin: Cologne, West Germany
- Genres: Krautrock; experimental rock; avant-funk; art rock; psychedelic funk
- Years active: 1968–1979; 1986; 1988; 1991; 1999
- Labels: Liberty; United Artists; Spoon; Mute
- Past members: Michael Karoli; Jaki Liebezeit; Irmin Schmidt; Holger Czukay; Malcolm Mooney; Damo Suzuki; David C. Johnson; Rosko Gee; Rebop Kwaku Baah
- Website: spoonrecords.com

Can were a German experimental rock band formed in Cologne in 1968 by Holger Czukay (bass, tape editing), Irmin Schmidt (keyboards), Michael Karoli (guitar), and Jaki Liebezeit (drums). They featured several vocalists, including American Malcolm Mooney (1968–70) and Japanese Damo Suzuki (1970–73). They have been hailed as pioneers of the German krautrock scene.

The founding members had backgrounds in avant-garde music and jazz. They blended elements of psychedelic rock, funk, and musique concrète on influential albums such as Tago Mago (1971), Ege Bamyasi (1972) and Future Days (1973). Can also had commercial success with singles such as "Spoon" (1971) and "I Want More" (1976) reaching national singles charts. Their work has influenced rock, post-punk, indie rock, post-rock and ambient acts.

== History ==
=== 1960s ===
"Father Cannot Yell"
"Father Cannot Yell" from Monster Movie

Can, initially named the Inner Space, was formed in Cologne, Germany, in 1968 by Holger Czukay (bass), Irmin Schmidt (keyboard), Jaki Liebezeit (drums) and Michael Karoli (guitar). Czukay and Schmidt were from academic backgrounds, students of the composer Karlheinz Stockhausen, and were fascinated by the possibilities of rock and roll. In mid-1968, Inner Space played their first show at an art opening at invitation of art collector Christoph Vohwinkel. The performance was taped and extracts were released in January 1985 as a cassette Prehistoric Future. The live performance was recorded with Manni Löhe, who provided flute, percussion and occasional vocals. In July 1968, through Irmin's film industry connections, the Inner Space were commissioned by the German public broadcaster ARD to provide a track, "Millionspiel", for the 1970 film Das Millionenspiel. It featured the saxophone player Gerd Dudek and was later released on the 2012 Lost Tapes compilation.

In late 1968, the Inner Space enlisted the American vocalist Malcolm Mooney. They recorded an album, Prepare to Meet Thy Pnoom, but could not find a recording company to release it. The Inner Space made the soundtrack pieces for 1969 films Agilok & Blubbo and Kamasutra: Vollendung der Liebe, making a brief appearance in the latter movie. "Man Named Joe", a track from Prepare to Meet Thy Pnoom, resurfaced on Kamasutra: Vollendung der Liebe.

At Mooney's suggestion, the band changed their name to Can. Around the time of Johnson's departure, Mooney suggested the name for its positive meanings in various languages—for example, the English can ("be able to"); the Turkish can (pronounced [dʒan]), meaning "soul", "spirit", or "life"; and the Japanese 感 (kan; "feeling, emotion") and ちゃん (-chan, a suffix meaning "beloved"). Liebezeit later suggested the backronym definition "communism, anarchism, nihilism", after an English magazine claimed that this was the intended meaning.

At the invitation of Vohwinkel, Can moved to Schloss Nörvenich, where they established the recording studio Inner Space. There, they recorded their debut album, Monster Movie (1969). It contained new versions of two songs previously recorded for Prepared to Meet Thy Pnoom, "Father Cannot Yell" and "Outside My Door". Monster Movie received acclaim.

During one live performance, Mooney shouted "upstairs, downstairs" for three hours, even after Can had stopped playing. On his psychiatrist's advice, he left Can and returned to the US at the end of 1969. He made his last recordings with Can that December. In 1970, Czukay and Liebezeit found a young Japanese expatriate, Damo Suzuki, busking outside a Munich café, and invited him to join their performance that night at the Blow Up club. He replaced Mooney as their lead vocalist.

In 1970, Can and Cat Stevens recorded music for the film Deep End (1970); Can contributed the fourteen-and-a-half-minute psychedelic track "Mother Sky", used in the Soho sequence. It was simultaneously released on Can's Soundtracks (1970) album alongside other music they had recorded for films.

=== 1971–1973 ===
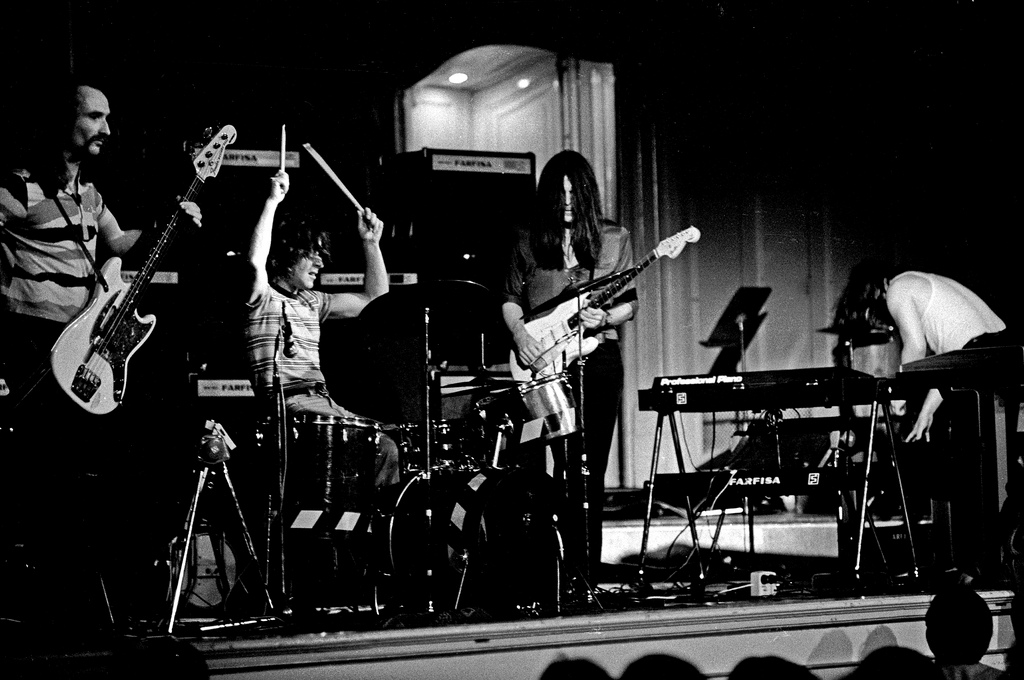
Performing in der Musikhalle Hamburg in 1972

The next few years saw Can release their most acclaimed works. While their earlier recordings were loosely based on traditional song structures, Can now developed a fluid improvisational style. The double album Tago Mago (1971) is often seen as groundbreaking, influential and deeply unconventional, based on intensely rhythmic jazz-inspired drumming, improvised guitar and keyboard solos, tape edits as composition, and Suzuki's idiosyncratic vocals. Czukay called the album "an attempt in achieving a mystery musical world from light to darkness and return".

In 1971, the band composed the music for the three-part German-language television crime miniseries Das Messer ("The Knife"), directed by Rolf von Sydow. The track "Spoon" was used as the theme song; released as a single, it reached number 6 in the German singles chart.

Tago Mago was followed in 1972 by Ege Bamyasi, a more accessible but still avant-garde record which featured "Spoon" and the follow-up single "Vitamin C". Czukay said, "We could achieve an excellent dry and ambient sound... [Ege Bamyasi] reflects the group being in a lighter mood."

It was followed by Future Days in 1973, including the single "Moonshake" placed between long, drawn out atmospheric songs. Czukay said, "'Bel Air' [the 20-minute track that takes up all of side two on the original Future Days LP] showed Can in a state of being an electric symphony group performing a peaceful though sometimes dramatic landscape painting", in a manner that has been retroactively compared to ambient music.

Suzuki left soon after the recording of Future Days to marry his German girlfriend and become a Jehovah's Witness. Vocals were taken over by Karoli and Schmidt, but after Suzuki's departure, fewer of Can's tracks featured vocals, as the band experimented with the ambient music it had begun with Future Days.

=== 1974–1979 ===
Soon Over Babaluma from 1974 continued in the atmospheric style of Future Days, but with some of the abrasive edge of Tago Mago and Ege Bamyasi returning. In 1975, Can signed with Virgin Records in the UK and EMI/Harvest in West Germany, appearing the same year on the BBC's Old Grey Whistle Test in a memorable performance of "Vernal Equinox" in which Schmidt played one keyboard section with a series of rapid karate chops. Shortly after the appearance, Schmidt suffered a broken leg which led to cancellation of the band's UK tour.

"I Want More"
"I Want More" (sample) from Flow Motion (1976)

Landed (1975) and Flow Motion (1976), saw Can moving towards a somewhat more conventional style as its recording technology improved. The disco-influenced single "I Want More" from Flow Motion became their only hit record outside of West Germany. Co-written by live sound mixer Peter Gilmour, it reached No 26 in the UK charts in October 1976, which prompted an appearance on Top of the Pops. In 1977 Can was joined by former Traffic bassist Rosko Gee and percussionist Rebop Kwaku Baah, both of whom also provided vocals; they appeared on the albums Saw Delight (1977), Out of Reach (1978) and Can (1979).

During this period, Czukay was pushed to the fringes of the group's activity due to disagreements about the band's creative direction and his limited abilities on his instrument. Bass guitar was something Czukay had "taken up almost by default" and he readily admitted his limitations. After Gee joined, Czukay primarily made sounds using shortwave radios, Morse code keys, tape recorders and other sundry objects. He left Can in late 1977 and did not appear on the albums Out of Reach or Can, although he was involved with production work for the latter album.

=== After the split and reunion ===
After the split, all the former members were involved in musical projects, often as session musicians for other artists. Czukay recorded several ambient albums and collaborated with David Sylvian among others. Jaki Liebezeit played extensively with bassists Jah Wobble and Bill Laswell, with a drum ensemble called Drums off Chaos and in 2005 with Datenverarbeiter on the online album Givt.

In 1986, Can briefly reformed with Mooney to record Rite Time (released in 1989). There was a further reunion in 1991 by Karoli, Liebezeit, Mooney and Schmidt to record a track for the Wim Wenders film Until the End of the World and in August 1999 by Karoli, Liebezeit and Schmidt with Jono Podmore to record a cover of "The Third Man Theme" for Grönland Records' compilation album Pop 2000. In 1999, the four core members of Can (Karoli, Liebezeit, Schmidt and Czukay) performed live at the same show, although playing separately with their current solo projects (Sofortkontakt, Club Off Chaos, Kumo and U-She respectively). Can have since been the subject of numerous compilations, live albums and samples. In 2004, the band began a series of Super Audio CD remasters of its back catalog, which were finished in 2006.

Karoli died of cancer on 17 November 2001. Liebezeit died of pneumonia on 22 January 2017. Czukay died of natural causes on 5 September 2017. Suzuki died of cancer on 9 February 2024.

== Archive releases ==
Can released a compilation album Limited Edition in 1974, and expanded it to a double album Unlimited Edition in 1976 from their unreleased studio recordings. Delay 1968, released in 1981, was a compilation of unreleased 1968–1969 recordings. Cannibalism 2, a compilation album of album and single material, also included one unreleased song, "Melting Away", from the 1960s.

In 1995, The Peel Sessions was released, a compilation of Can recordings at the BBC. In 1999, Can Box was released, with a Can video documentary, a concert recording from 1972 and a double live CD compiled by Michael Karoli and later released separately as Can Live Music (Live 1971–1977). Unreleased live music by Can was also released on the 40th Anniversary Edition of Tago Mago in 2011 and 17 LP collection box Can in 2014.

The Lost Tapes, released in 2012, was overseen by Irmin Schmidt and Daniel Miller, compiled by Schmidt and Jono Podmore, and edited by Podmore. A series of releases of live recordings began in 2021 and had reached 6 releases as of November 2024, with the recording dates ranging from 1973 to 1977.

== Style ==
Can developed a repetitive, rhythmic style with influences of North African music, Stockhausen, and American minimalists such as Steve Reich and Terry Riley. Czukay and Schmidt were both pupils of Stockhausen, and Can inherited a grounding in his musical theory. Schmidt was trained as a classical pianist, while Karoli brought the influence of gypsy music through his esoteric studies. Liebezeit had strong jazz leanings. The band's sound was originally intended to be based on the sound of ethnic music, so when the band decided to pick up the garage rock sound, original member David Johnson left. This world music trend was later exemplified on albums such as Ege Bamyasi (the name meaning "Aegean okra" in Turkish), Future Days and Saw Delight, and by incorporating new band members with different nationalities. A series of tracks on Can albums, known as "Ethnological Forgery Series", abbreviated to "E.F.S.", demonstrated the band's ability to successfully recreate ethnic-sounding music. They constructed their music largely through collective spontaneous composition, sampling themselves in the studio and editing down the results. Czukay referred to Can's live and studio performances as "instant compositions".

The band's early rock influences include the Beatles and the Velvet Underground as well as Jimi Hendrix, Sly Stone and Frank Zappa. The band have admitted that the beginning of Can's "Father Cannot Yell" was inspired by the Velvet Underground's "European Son". Malcolm Mooney's voice has been compared to that of James Brown (an acknowledged hero of the band members) and their early style, rooted in psychedelic music, drew comparisons with Pink Floyd. Czukay's extensive editing has occasionally been compared to the late-1960s music of trumpeter Miles Davis (such as In a Silent Way and Bitches Brew): Can and Davis both would record long groove-intensive improvisations, then edit the best bits together for their albums. Czukay and Teo Macero (Davis's producer and editor) both had roots in the musique concrète of the 1940s and 1950s. Irmin Schmidt stated in a discussion with Michael Karoli in 1996 concerning the various citations of influences upon their music: "You know, it's funny that in spite of all the supposed influences on us that have been written about, the one overriding influence has never been mentioned: Michael von Biel."

Suzuki was a very different singer from Mooney, with a multilingual (he claimed to sing in "the language of the Stone Age") and often inscrutable vocal style. With Suzuki, the band made their most critically and commercially successful albums. The rhythm section's work on Tago Mago has been especially praised: one critic writes that much of the album is based on "long improvisations built around hypnotic rhythm patterns"; another writes that "Halleluhwah" finds them "pounding out a monster trance/funk beat".

=== Improvisation, recording and live shows ===
Much of Can's music was based on free improvisation and then edited for the studio albums. Karlheinz Freynik, after visiting one of Can's sessions described them as "very anarchic", as if they were "turning away from the others, and diving into their subconscious, and playing their things", but after a while they moved into the centerpiece of the improvisation, "they gathered and their minds kind of connected to each other." The band, commenting on their style, said the core of their synergy is a spiritual communication in contrast to intellectual communication—they does not hear what the other members play, but playing by themselves. If their individual direction worked out, "everything melted together".

Malcolm Mooney, describing the band's daily routine in early 1960s, said the band worked every day for about thirteen hours a day with a lunch break. After the recording, they reviewed the recent tapes at home and take notes. Malcolm listened to the tracks, and "planned a change of lyric, or tell Irmin. Because Irmin for me was a tutor in this music."

When preparing soundtracks, only Irmin Schmidt would view the film and then give the rest of the band a general description of the scenes they would be scoring. This assisted in the improvised soundtrack being successful both inside and outside the film's context.

Can's live shows often spontaneously melded improvisational snippets with sonical fragments from their albums. The track "Colchester Finale", appearing on the Can Live album, incorporates portions of "Halleluhwah" into a composition lasting over half an hour. Early concerts found Mooney and Suzuki often able to shock audiences. The actor David Niven was asked by Czukay what he had thought of a concert, Niven replied: "It was great, but I didn't know it was music." After the departure of Suzuki, the music grew in intensity without a vocal centre. The band maintained their ability to collectively improvise with or without central themes for hours at a time (their longest performance, in Berlin, lasted over six hours), resulting in a large archive of performances. Can made attempts to find a new vocalist after the departure of Damo Suzuki, although no one quite fit the position. In 1975, folk singer Tim Hardin took the lead vocal spot and played guitar with Can for one song, at two gigs, performing his own "The Lady Came From Baltimore". Malaysian vocalist Thaiga Raj Raja Ratnam played six dates with the band between January and March 1976. Another temporary vocalist, Englishman Michael Cousins, a.k.a. "Magic Michael", toured with Can from March (France) to April (West Germany) 1976.

== Legacy and influence ==
In the late 1970s, Can influenced major artists working in the post-punk genre such as Siouxsie and the Banshees, the Fall, Public Image Ltd, Teardrop Explodes's Julian Cope, and Joy Division. In the 1980s, Can were referenced by British new wave acts such as Pete Shelley, Gary Numan, Ultravox, The Jesus and Mary Chain and Primal Scream. The Lumerians and Happy Mondays have cited Can as an influence. Critic Simon Reynolds wrote that "Can's pan-global avant-funk anticipated many of the moves made by sampladelic dance genres like trip hop, ethnotechno and ambient jungle." Brian Eno made a short film in tribute to Can, while John Frusciante of the Red Hot Chili Peppers appeared at the Echo Awards ceremony, at which Can were awarded the most prestigious music award in Germany.

Radiohead cited Can as an influence on their albums Kid A (2000) and Amnesiac (2001). Inspired by Can, they constructed their own studio and worked by recording jams and editing the recordings. Radiohead covered "The Thief" in live performances in the early 2000s. Mark E. Smith of the Fall paid tribute to Suzuki with the track "I Am Damo Suzuki" on the 1985 album This Nation's Saving Grace. The Jesus and Mary Chain covered "Mushroom" live in the mid-1980s. Mark Hollis of Talk Talk had mentioned Can several times as an influence for their later albums, Spirit of Eden and Laughing Stock. Avant-pop band Stereolab often incorporate a repetitive motorik beat, promoted by Can.

At least five notable bands have named themselves in tribute to Can: the Mooney Suzuki for Malcolm Mooney and Damo Suzuki; the indie rock band Spoon after the hit "Spoon"; the electronic band Egebamyasi, formed by Scottish musician Mr Egg in 1984, after Can's album Ege Bamyasi; Hunters & Collectors after a song on the Landed album; and Moonshake, named for a track on Future Days, and formed by ex-Wolfhounds frontman David Callahan. The Scottish writer Alan Warner has written two novels dedicated to several Can members (Morvern Callar to Holger Czukay, The Man Who Walks to Michael Karoli, Kitchenly 434 to Irmin Schmidt), as well as publishing Tago Mago: Permission to Dream, about their album Tago Mago. The Sacrilege remix album features remixes of Can tracks by artists who were influenced by Can and krautrock in general, including Brian Eno, The Orb, Sonic Youth, and U.N.K.L.E. Their ethnomusicological tendencies pre-date the craze for world music in the 1980s. While not nearly as influential on electronic music as Kraftwerk, they were important early pioneers of ambient music, along with Tangerine Dream and the aforementioned band. Many groups working in the post-rock genre can look to Can as an influence as part of the larger krautrock scene, as can New Prog bands such as The Mars Volta. Rolling Stone called the group a "pioneering space rock band". Kanye West has sampled "Sing Swan Song" on his song "Drunk & Hot Girls" from his 2007 album Graduation. The UK band Loop was deeply influenced by Can for their repetitive polyrhythmic style, covering Can's "Mother Sky" on their Black Sun EP. The Yugoslav progressive/psychedelic rock band Igra Staklenih Perli, heavily influenced by Can, on their self-titled debut album released the song "Pečurka" ("Mushroom") as a tribute to Can.

In the 21st century, the band has been name-checked as a formative influence in LCD Soundsystem's debut single "Losing My Edge". Oasis' 2008 single "The Shock of the Lightning" was inspired by Can and Neu!. The Japanese psych/krautrock band Minami Deutsch is heavily influenced by Can, and band member Kyotaro Mitula performed with Damo Suzuki at the Roadburn Festival.

== Members ==
- Michael Karoli – guitar, vocals, violin (1968–1979, 1986, 1988, 1991, 1999; died 2001)
- Jaki Liebezeit – drums, percussion, double bass, piano (1968–1979, 1986, 1988, 1991, 1999; died 2017)
- Irmin Schmidt – keyboards, vocals (1968–1979, 1986, 1988, 1991, 1999)
- Holger Czukay – bass, sound engineer, electronics, vocals, French horn (1968–1977, 1986, 1988; died 2017)
- David C. Johnson – reeds, winds, electronics and tape manipulation (1968; died 2021)
- Malcolm Mooney – vocals (1968–1970, 1986, 1988, 1991)
- Damo Suzuki – vocals, percussion (1970–1973; died 2024)
- Rosko Gee – bass, vocals (1977–1979)
- Rebop Kwaku Baah – percussion, vocals (1977–1979; died 1983)

=== Additional collaborators ===
- Margarethe Juvan - vocals (1968)
- Manni Löhe – vocals, percussion and flute (1968; died 1978)
- Duncan Fallowell – lyrics (1974)
- René Tinner – recording engineer (1973–1979, 1986, 1991)
- Olaf Kübler of Amon Düül – tenor saxophone (1975; died 2024)
- Tim Hardin – vocals & guitar (November 1975) (died 1980)
- Thaiga Raj Raja Ratnam – vocals (January–March 1976)
- Michael Cousins – vocals (March–April 1976)
- Peter Gilmour – lyrics, live sound mixing (later 1970s)
- Jono Podmore – recording engineer, bass (1999), soundprocessing and editing engineer (1999, 2003, 2011–2012)

== Discography ==
(US labels in parentheses)

- Monster Movie (Liberty, 1969)
- Tago Mago (first of four albums on United Artists, 1971)
- Ege Bamyasi (1972)
- Future Days (1973)
- Soon Over Babaluma (1974)
- Landed (Virgin, 1975)
- Flow Motion (first of four albums on Harvest, 1976)
- Saw Delight (1977)
- Out of Reach (1978)
- Can (1979)
- Rite Time (Mercury, 1989)

== Videography ==
- Romantic Warriors IV: Krautrock (2019)
