= Landed (album) =

Studio album by Can
- Released: 12 September 1975
- Recorded: February–April 1975
- Studio: Inner Space Studio, Weilerswist, near Cologne, Germany
- Genre: Krautrock
- Length: 40:18
- Label: Hörzu; EMI Electrola; Virgin
- Producer: Can

Can chronology
Soon Over Babaluma (1974)	Landed (1975)	Unlimited Edition (1976)

Singles from Landed
- 1. ""Hunters and Collectors"" Released: 1976

Audio sample
- Hunters and Collectors: file; help

Landed is the sixth studio album by the German krautrock band Can, released in September 1975 by Virgin Records. It is the first Can album to get what producer Holger Czukay described as a "professional mix", marked by a more layered sound provided by the 16-track tape recording process.

== Recording and production ==
Can played a version of "Full Moon on the Highway" at Can Free Concert in February 1972.

Landed was recorded in 1975 at Inner Space Studios in Weilerswist, near Cologne. Holger Czukay engineered the recording process and mixed side B at Inner Space. He teamed with Toby Robinson to mix side A at Studio Dierks in Stommeln. René Tinner assisted with the mix for both sides.

Landed became the first Can album recorded with MCI JH-16 16-track tape recorder, replacing their previous two-track tape recorder. The new tape recorder doubled the productivity of their recording studio and allowed the production of composition layered with more overlapping sounds.

The title "Landed" indicates a touchdown after Can's previous record, Soon Over Babaluma. Landed album cover was created by Christine Scholl, head of Can fan-club and Jaki Liebezeit's girlfriend at the time. Scholl had been sending out promotional postcards and portraits of the band, printed on the backside cover of Soon Over Babaluma and autographed by Can. She piled up a number of these portraits and doodled on them, drawing beards, moustaches, rouged cheeks and lipstick, eyepatches, and elaborate bouffants. She then assembled thirty of these six drawings into a collage.

== Music ==
The track "Red Hot Indians" features Amon Düül's Olaf Kübler playing dual sax solos.

"Unfinished" is a thirteen-minute edit of one prolonged session referred by the band as "the magic day". It was recorded in the studio conditions that let their instruments practically play themselves. Michael called it "one of those pieces where we let the atmosphere of the studio impress itself on the tape, it's really a piece composed by the studio". "Unfinished" was recorded with Selmer organ, which was broken and didn't make ordinary organ sounds. At the beginning of the "Unfinished" session the organ started producing a continuous noise all by itself. Irmin liked the noise, and the band used it as the basis of the track.

== Release ==
The song "Hunters and Collectors", backed by a shorter version of "Vernal Equinox", was released as a single in Germany on the Harvest label that same year.

== Reception and legacy ==
Professional retrospective reviews
Review scores
Source	Rating
AllMusic	2/5 stars
Encyclopedia of Popular Music	3/5 stars
Pitchfork	6.1/10
Spin Alternative Record Guide	8/10
The Rolling Stone Album Guide	3/5 stars
Tom Hull – on the Web	B+

In a mixed review for Pitchfork, Dominique Leone compared Landed to Can's previous discography, concluding that the new material lost the "epic, funky ambient songs or minimalist rock experiments in favor of some pretty straightforward jam-band tunes." But Leone also lauded the "deft pace" and the skillful guitar work, highlighting "Red Hot Indians" as a more interesting song, "sounding like bizarre tropical jazz-pop". However, he didn't like Karoli's "thin, decidedly non-rock chipmunk chorus", and felt that the 13-minute closer track "Unfinished" doesn't really "fit with the rest of the record, but does at least give Can the chance to stretch out their most experimental ideas into 16 tracks, and is reminiscent of 'Cutaway' or some of the more out-there moments on Tago Mago".

Spin Alternative Record Guide called Landed the last great album released by Can, highlighting "the protozoan amorphousness" of "Unfinished".

Irmin Schmidt, Can's keyboardist, described Toby Robinson's work on mixing the album as "listening so loud and mixing so loud and insisting that it's rock that we couldn't really judge what the fuck he was doing. So after that was mixed we came back to our studio, listened to the mixed tape properly in a civilised loudness, and were extremely disappointed. Of course, we had to use it, but it sounds like a satirical version of rock music, which we didn't mean at all. And still I think 'Full Moon on the Highway' is one of our worst pieces. Not because of the piece, but because of the sound."

Rob Young, author of Can's biography, described the album as "both more detailed and more dry, claustrophobic in places, as if the group members have drawn themselves into a huddle in the middle of the studio." Young added that the new MCI JH-16 16-track tape recorder brought unpaved difficulties. The technology of the new tape recorder allowed the band to record in isolation and exponentially add sound layers, which produced a more "fragmented and solitary" album.

Musician Barry Adamson included the album in a list of his 13 favourite albums. Australian rock band Hunters & Collectors took their name from the song of the same title.

== Track listing ==
All music is composed by Czukay, Karoli, Liebezeit, Schmidt.

Side one
No.	Title	Lyrics	Length
1.	"Full Moon on the Highway"	Czukay, Karoli, Liebezeit, Schmidt, Peter Gilmour	3:32
2.	"Half Past One"	Czukay, Karoli, Liebezeit, Schmidt, Peter Gilmour	4:39
3.	"Hunters and Collectors"	Czukay, Karoli, Liebezeit, Schmidt	4:19
4.	"Vernal Equinox"	instrumental	8:48

Side two
No.	Title	Lyrics	Length
5.	"Red Hot Indians"	Czukay, Karoli, Liebezeit, Schmidt	5:38
6.	"Unfinished"	instrumental	13:21
Total length:			40:18

=== Notes ===
- Recorded at Inner Space Studio (Weilerswist, near Cologne) by Holger Czukay 1975, assisted by Bob Hickmott
- Tracks 1 to 4 mixed by Toby Robinson and Holger Czukay at Studio Dierks, Stommeln, Germany
- Tracks 5 and 6 mixed by Holger Czukay at Inner Space Studio, Weilerswist, Germany
- Composed, written and produced by Can.

== Personnel ==
=== Can ===
- Holger Czukay – bass, vocals on "Full Moon on the Highway"
- Michael Karoli – guitar, violin, lead vocals
- Jaki Liebezeit – drums, percussion, winds
- Irmin Schmidt – keyboards, Alpha 77, vocals on "Full Moon on the Highway"
- Olaf Kübler – tenor saxophone on "Red Hot Indians"

=== Production ===
- Holger Czukay – engineer, mixing
- Toby Robinson – mixing (Side A only)
- René Tinner – recording assistant and road management
- Bobby Hickmott – equipment control
- Christine – cover collage
- J. B. Lansing – P.A.
- Farfisa keyboards – electronics
- Alpha 77 - Zurich – electronics
