= Michael Karoli =

German musician (1948–2001)

- Born: 29 April 1948; Straubing, Bavaria, Germany
- Died: 17 November 2001 (aged 53) Essen, Germany
- Instruments: Guitar; violin
- Formerly of: Can

Michael Karoli (29 April 1948 – 17 November 2001) was a German guitarist, violinist, and sound-mixer. He was a founding member of the krautrock band Can.

== Biography ==
=== Early life ===
Michael Karoli was born 29 April 1948 in Straubing, Bavaria, to Susanne and Hermann Karoli. The year of his birth, his father Hermann "had just been freed after testifying in the Nuremberg Trials" and Pohl trial. Hermann had been a member of the Waffen-SS and fought on the Eastern Front during World War II. After Hermann got shot in the lung, he was moved back to Berlin, where he headed the audit department of the Berlin administrative centre until the end of the war. In 1943, Hermann married Susanne who had worked as a film editor. After the trials, Hermann and his brother Richard established an accounting company based in Essen, and in 1971 Der Spiegel magazine called Karoli one of the "most influential consultants to West German companies".

Growing up, Michael Karoli learned banjo, violin, cello, and electric guitar. Karoli familiarized himself with a wide range of music from classical and Romani music to swing and blues. While attending boarding school in St Gallen, Switzerland, he started a band with his school friends playing modern jazz, and by the mid-sixties switched to rock, pop, and soul music emerging from Britain and US.

In 1966, Karoli befriended his guitar teacher Holger Czukay, introducing Czukay to the contemporary rock music of The Beatles, Velvet Underground, and Frank Zappa. They played with rock pianist Tony Ashton and several members of his band, Remo Four, proposing him an idea to form an experimental band, but didn't follow through. When Michael was finishing school, Czukay was fired from the Institut auf dem Rosenberg, as Czukay explained, "for being too … er … intriguing!"

=== Career ===
In late Autumn 1967, as Michael began studying for a law degree in Lausanne, Czukay got the letter from his ex-classmate Irmin Schmidt, inviting him to visit Cologne and join his band. Czukay brought Karoli with him and formed Can. According to Schmidt, Karoli "had to fight with his family, doubting his career choice. Schmidt and Holger talked to Hermann Karoli and convinced him that "it was really something serious." Hermann "reluctantly gave in". When Can debuted their first album, Monster Movie, Hermann told the band he liked the song "Father Cannot Yell", and Schmidt said Hermann was "very convinced that they had a marvellous group".

While playing with Can, Karoli mostly performed on guitar and violin, occasionally picking up bağlama, bass, and various non western instruments. After vocalist Damo Suzuki left Can in late 1973, Karoli became the band's main vocalist. In the years following the Can's split, Karoli joined the band for its three reunions, in 1986, 1991, and 1999. Karoli continued working with the ex-members of Can, appearing on albums made by Irmin Schmidt and Holger Czukay.

Soon after the release of Can's 1976 album Flow Motion, Karoli and his girlfriend Shirley set out on a trip to central and east Africa for a couple of weeks, traveling through the Congo, Zaïre, and Kenya". In 1997, Karoli told a journalist: "When you visit a nightclub in Africa where a good highlife band is playing, you feel like a carrot chucked into a boiling soup. You have to move… that influence was inevitable on Saw Delight". Karoli's bandmate, Rosko Gee, confirmed that "Michael's style of playing may have changed after his trip", and thought Michael became a better guitar player, comparing the aftermath of his trip to the revelation that hit George Harrison after his trip to India.

After leaving Can, Karoli invested in property in southern France, buying a former olive oil mill near Nice and establishing his own recording studio at home, calling it "The Outer Space Recording Studio". Karoli developed the atmospheric "Microsonic" recording technique, and collaborated with vocalist Polly Eltes, for the next three years irregularly working in his studio and coming up with album Deluge. The album was mastered by Holger Czukay and released by Spoon Records in 1984. Rob Young, Can's biographer, described Deluge as post-punk and reggae. Outside of Deluge, Karoli recorded several other albums in the Outer Space studio: Neue Deutsche Welle group called The Bit, Irmin Schmidt's Rote Erde soundtrack, Belgian Asociality's album, and 1989 Can album Rite Time.

Between 1981 and 1986, Karoli studied African rhythm and dance with the drummer Seni Camara.

In 1999, Karoli participated in CAN Solo Projects concerts with his group SOFORTKONTAKT, named after a late-night TV ad for a sex hotline. The group consisted of Michael Karoli, Felix Gutierrez, and Alexander Schoenert.

== Family ==
Karoli dated Eveline Grunwald from 1971 to 1976, meeting her when Can played at a Hannover nightclub, where she was working behind the bar, and moved to Cologne to be with Michael. Eveline "kept close ties to the Can family", befriending Hildegard and Irmin Schmidt, and often looking after their young daughter while the parents were on tour. Eveline "rarely went on tour with Can, and was determined to pursue her own career", studying to be an illustrator. Around 1976, Karoli met Shirley Argwings-Kodhek, a British woman who had been brought up in Kenya and introduced to Can by Peter Gilmour. Gilmore met her by chance on one of his trips to Cologne, saying: "We took the same ferry and train, and I got talking to her and we started seeing each other, and then Micky sort of admired her from afar, I think. He eventually asked me for permission to … I mean, it was only a casual relationship I had with Shirley. That's the way things were in those days." Rob Young, Can's biographer, described Michael as "never the most faithful partner", and Grunwald said: "Micky was the womaniser. He would swear his love to me, but I think when I wasn't there… This is how Shirley came into the whole thing".

Karoli married Shirley Argwings-Kodhek on 15 September 1981, in Essen. Shirley participated in the recording of the last Can album, Rite Time, contributing as a background vocalist. They had two daughters: Tamara Karoli, born in April 1989, and Angie, born in May 1992. Tamara has been working in photography.

Karoli's sister Constanze Karoli and his then-girlfriend Eveline Grunwald are the models featured on the cover of Roxy Music's 1974 album Country Life. They inadvertently connected with Bryan Ferry of Roxy Music and his art director when taking a vacation at the same resort in Algarve, Portugal.

== Death ==
Karoli died on 17 November 2001 at the age of 53 in what was later reported as an undisclosed form of cancer. Before his death, Karoli scheduled an "informal recording session" in Dortmund with drummer Thomas Hopf and electronic musician Mark Spybey.

== Discography ==
Solo

- Deluge (1984) with Polly Eltes

Can

- Monster Movie (1969)
- Soundtracks (1970)
- Tago Mago (1971)
- Ege Bamyasi (1972)
- Future Days (1973)
- Soon Over Babaluma (1974)
- Landed (1975)
- Flow Motion (1976)
- Saw Delight (1977)
- Out of Reach (1978)
- Can (1979)
- Rite Time (1989)

Holger Czukay

- Movies (1979) ("Oh Lord Give Us More Money")
- Rome Remains Rome (1987)
- Flux + Mutability (1989)
- Radio Wave Surfer (1991)
- Moving Pictures (1993)
- Good Morning Story (1999)
- Time And Tide (2001) with U-She ("Child")

Irmin Schmidt

- Filmmusik (1980) ("Im Herzen Des Hurrican (Verfolgung)")
- Filmmusik Vol.2 (1981) ("Endstation Freiheit - Titelmusik")
- Filmmusik Vol. 3 & 4 (1983) ("You Make Me Nervous")
- Rote Erde - Originalmusik Zur Fernsehserie
- Roll On, Euphrates (1986)
- Musk At Dusk (1987)
- Filmmusik Vol. 5 (1989)
- Impossible Holidays (1991)
- Gormenghast (2000)

Other

- Playboys (1985) — Les Playboys
- Charlatan (1988) — Arno
- Tales Of Purple Sally (1995) — Alex Oriental Experience
- Jpn Ultd Vol. 1 — Damo Suzuki's Network (2000)
- Jpn Ultd Vol. 2— Damo Suzuki's Network (2002)

== Works cited ==
- Young, Rob; Schmidt, Irmin (2018). All Gates Open: The Story of Can (e-book ed.). London: Faber and Faber. ISBN 978-0-571-31151-4.
