= René Tinner =

Swiss recording engineer and producer (born 1953)

- Born: 18 February 1953 (age 73); St. Gallen, Switzerland
- Genres: Experimental, rock, ambient, blues, jazz, world music
- Occupation: Record Producer

René Lee Tinner (born February 18, 1953, in St. Gallen) is a Swiss recording engineer and producer who has produced over 200 studio records and numerous live performances.

== Career ==
Tinner began his career as the audio engineer of the noted German Krautrock band Can in 1973, with whom he recorded seven albums until 1989. In 1978, he took over the Can-Studio, the Cologne-based band’s the rehearsal and recording room. Tinner managed the studio until it was dismantled and integrated into the German rock'n pop museum in Gronau on November 9, 2007, where it was inaugurated in the presence of all the Can band members and René Tinner himself.

During this time, he also worked as a producer with a variety of artists and bands. During 1978-79, he worked with Lou Reed on Live: Take No Prisoners and The Bells. Other artists and bands Tinner worked with in his capacity as a producer include Maloo (on their single “The Captain of Her Heart”), KFC, Joachim Witt, Trio, Traffic, Holger Czukay, Die Krupps, Floyd George, Julian Dawson, Marius Müller-Westernhagen, Helen Schneider, Fury in the Slaughterhouse, Jule Neigel Band, and Kreisler. In addition, Tinner also produced Jim Capaldi's Living On the Outside (2001).

Tinner went on to work with other performers such as German actor and musician Marius Müller-Westernhagen, Russian band Mumiy Troll, German comedian Dieter Nuhr, Norwegian alternative rock band Serena-Maneesh, and others.

Tinner has also worked on a number of television and film soundtracks. In 2008, Tinner recorded the film music for the Wim Wenders production Palermo Shooting (which was presented at Cannes Film Festival in 2008). Other notable television and film soundtrack productions include Knife in the Head (Reinhard Hauff, 1978), Schneeland (Hans W. Geißendörfer, 2004) and Stolen Ransom (Stephan Wagner, 2012). Tinner is also active as a producer at the Minneapolis-based independent production company Megabien Entertainment.

== Discography ==
- CAN: Soon over Babaluma, 1974
- CAN: Landed, 1975
- CAN: Flow Motion, 1976
- CAN: Saw Delight, 1977
- CAN: Out of reach, 1978
- CAN: Can, 1979
- Lou Reed: LIVE Take no prisoners, 1979
- Lou Reed: The Bells, 1979
- Joachim Witt: Silberblick, 1980
- Mitch Ryder: Got change for a million, 1980
- Duesenberg: Strangers, 1980
- Irmin Schmidt: Filmmusik Vol. 1, 1980
- Holger Czukay: On the way to the peak of normal, 1981
- Jaki Liebezeit & Phantom Band: Phantom Band, 1981
- Irmin Schmidt: Filmmusik Vol. 2, 1981
- Joachim Witt: Edelweiß, 1982
- Jaki Liebezeit & Phantom Band: Freedom of speech, 1983
- Trio: Bye Bye, 1983
- Joachim Witt: Märchenblau, 1983
- Holger Czukay: Der Osten ist rot, 1984
- Marius Müller-Westernhagen: Die Sonne so rot, 1984
- Zeltinger Band: Der Chef, 1984
- Joachim Witt: Mit Rucksack und Harpune, 1985
- Holger Czukay & Jah Wobble Full Circle, 1985
- Jaki Liebezeit & Phantom Band: Nowhere, 1985
- Double: Blue (Captain of her heart), 1985
- Marius Müller-Westernhagen: Lausige Zeiten, 1986
- Romie Singh: Masters, 1986
- Irmin Schmidt: Musk at Dusk, 1987
- Julian Dawson: As real as Disneyland, 1987
- Rams: Romantic Challenge, 1987
- Julian Dawson: Luckiest Man in the Western World, 1988
- Marius Müller-Westernhagen: Westernhagen, 1988
- Holger Czukay & David Sylvian: Plight & Premonition, 1988
- CAN: Rite Time, 1989
- Marius Müller-Westernhagen: Halleluja, 1989
- Haindling: Muh, 1989
- Holger Czukay & David Sylvian Flux & Mutability, 1989
- Marius Müller-Westernhagen: LIVE, 1990
- Jule Neigel Band: Wilde Welt, 1990
- Kreisler: So bizarre, 1990
- Irmin Schmidt: Impossible Holidays, 1991
- Hans Christian Müller: Zeit lassn, 1992
- Jingo de Lunch: Déja Voodoo, 1994
- Floyd George: Teenage Radio, 1994
- Hubert von Goisern & die Alpinkatzen: Omunduntn, 1994
- Michel van Dyke: Reincarnation, 1994
- Doran, Studer, Minton, Bates, Ali: Play the music of Jimi Hendrix, 1994
- Kurt Maloo: Soul & Echo, 1995
- Fury in the Slaughterhouse: Brilliant Thieves, 1997
- Pia Lund: Lundaland, 1999
- Eric D. Clark: Fur Dancefloor, 1999
- Element of Crime: Psycho Engineer 1999
- Marius Müller-Westernhagen: So weit, 2000
- Hans Nieswandt: Lazer Musik, 2000
- Pia Lund: La folie Angélique, 2001
- Element of Crime: Romantic, 2001
- Jim Capaldi: Living on the outside, 2001
- Justus Köhncke: Was ist Musik, 2002
- Jim Capaldi: Poor boy blue, 2003
- The New London Chorale: The young Mendelsohn, 2003
- Justus Köhncke: Doppelleben, 2004
- Andreas Dorau: Ich bin der eine von uns beiden, 2005
- Helen Schneider: Like a woman, 2007
- Marius Müller-Westernhagen: Wunschkonzert, 2008
- Serena Maneesh: No 2: Abyss in B Minor, 2009
- Safranski, Joeres, Schmeckenbecher: Schiller und die Romantik, 2009
- Irmin Schmidt: Filmmusik Anthology Vol. 4 & 5, 2009
- Zeltinger Band: Die Rückkehr des Retters, 2010
- Dieter Nuhr: Nuhr unter uns (Comedy), 2011
- Fortuna Ehrenfeld: Das Ende der Coolness Vol.2, 2015

== Filmography ==
- Eurogang (TV-series), engineer (4 episodes), 1975
- Messer im Kopf (film directed by Reinhard Hauff), engineer, 1978
- Flächenbrand (directed by Alexander v. Eschwege), engineer, 1981
- Die Heimsuchung des Assistenten Jung (film directed by Thomas Schamoni), engineer, 1981
- Rote Erde I & II (TV-series directed by Klaus Emmerich), engineer (14 episodes), 1983/86
- Westernhagen Live (video), music producer and mixing engineer, 1990
- Lola da musica (TV-series), himself, 1997
- CAN: Het zwarte gat (TV documentary), himself, 1997
- Tausendschönchen (TV-series (Bloch) directed by Christoph Stark), engineer, 2003
- Silbergraue Augen (TV-series (Bloch) directed by Markus O. Rosenmüller), engineer, 2003
- Ich werde immer bei Euch sein (TV-series directed by Markus Fischer), engineer, 2003
- Wenn Frauen Austern essen (TV film (Tatort) directed by Klaus Emmerich), engineer 2003
- Fleck auf der Haut (TV-series (Bloch) directed by Stephan Wagner), engineer, 2004
- Schwestern (TV-series (Bloch) directed by Edward Berger), engineer, 2004
- Der Stich des Skorpion (TV film directed by Stephan Wagner), engineer, 2004
- Schneeland (film directed by Hans W. Geißendörfer), engineer, 2004
- Ein krankes Herz (TV-series (Bloch) directed by Michael Hammon), engineer, 2005
- Palermo Shooting (movie directed by Wim Wenders), engineer, 2008
- Da Da Da - Drei Mann im Doppelbett (TV movie documentary), himself, 2009
- Spiegel TV - "Inside Nazi Germany" (documentary), engineer, 2011
- Stolen Ransom (film directed by Stephan Wagner), engineer, 2012
- Hundstage (TV film (Tatort) directed by Stephan Wagner), engineer and mixing 2015
