= Irmin Schmidt =

German keyboardist and composer (born 1937)

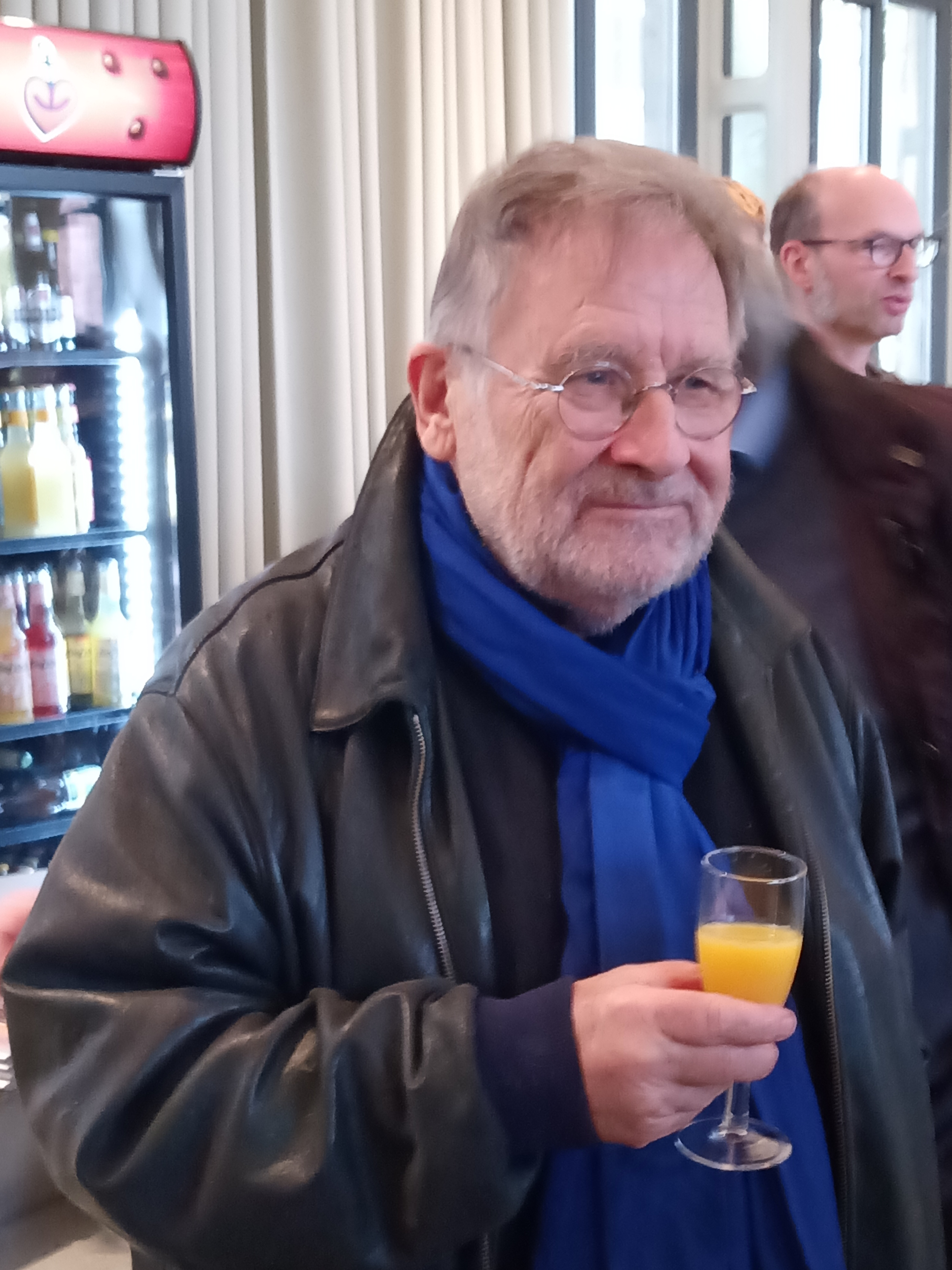
- Schmidt in 2022
- Born: 29 May 1937 (age 89); Berlin, Germany
- Education: Folkwang Hochschule; Mozarteum
- Occupations: Composer; Keyboardist; Conductor
- Organizations: Theater Aachen; Schauspielschule Bochum; Can
- Spouse: Hildegard Schmidt (m. 1963)
- Awards: Ordre des Arts et des Lettres (Chevalier); Order of Merit of the Federal Republic of Germany
- Website: irminschmidt.com

Irmin Schmidt (born 29 May 1937) is a German keyboardist and composer, best known as a founding member of the krautrock band Can and composer of numerous film scores.

Before joining Can, Schmidt studied composition with composers as György Ligeti, Karlheinz Stockhausen, Luciano Berio, Henri Pousseur, Earle Brown, and István Kertész. He started work mainly as a conductor performing concerts with the Bochumer Symphoniker, the Vienna Symphony, and the Dortmunder Ensemble für Neue Musik that he had founded. During this time, Schmidt conducted the German premiere of John Cage's Atlas Eclipticalis with the Bochumer Symphoniker. By 1966 Schmidt became Kapellmeister at the Theater Aachen and taught vocal technique at the Schauspielschule Bochum.

From the early 1980s, Schmidt produced soundtrack compositions for films such as Knife in the Head (1978) and Palermo Shooting (2008). Additionally, he has recorded solo albums and written an opera, Gormenghast, based on Mervyn Peake's Gormenghast Trilogy. He received the Ordre des Arts et des Lettres (Chevalier) in 2015 and Order of Merit of the Federal Republic of Germany in 2025.

== Life and career ==
Irmin Schmidt was born on 29 May 1937 in Berlin, to Kurt and Margot Schmidt. Schmidt's father was an architect and engineer, and both his parents played piano. They openly supported the Nazi regime. While attending a boarding school in 1950s, he wrote in the school newspaper about his tutor who taught modern history of the Reichsarbeitsdienst, which got him fired.

Schmidt began his studies in music at the conservatory in Dortmund, and expanded his education in conducting at the Folkwang Hochschule in Essen, studying under Heinz Dressel. While at the Hochschule he also took piano lessons from Detlef Kraus and studied composition with György Ligeti. Schmidt started work mainly as a conductor, performing concerts with the Bochumer Symphoniker, the Vienna Symphony, and the Dortmunder Ensemble für Neue Musik that he founded in 1962 to perform contemporary music. During this time, Schmidt conducted the German premiere of John Cage's Atlas Eclipticalis with the Bochumer Symphoniker and performed Cage's piano piece "Winter Music".

Schmidt attended the Mozarteum in Salzburg to further develop his conducting skills, studying with István Kertész. In 1964-1965, he attended the Cologne Courses for Neue Musik at the Rheinische Musikschule in Cologne, taught by Karlheinz Stockhausen, Luciano Berio, Henri Pousseur, and Earle Brown; the course was also attended by his future bandmates, Holger Schüring (later to change his surname to Czukay) and David C. Johnson. By 1966 Schmidt became Kapellmeister at the Theater Aachen and taught vocal technique at the Schauspielschule Bochum.

In January 1966, Schmidt made his first visit to the United States, flying to New York City to compete in the International Dimitri Mitropoulos Competition for Composers. He immersed himself in the city's rapidly developing underground arts scene, watching Andy Warhol movies and spending time with several progenitors of avant-garde and minimalist music, including La Monte Young, Dick Higgins, Steve Reich, and Terry Riley. Schmidt played piano in a session with Riley. Schmidt's spouse Hildegard introduced him to Russian-American composer Serge Tcherepnin, and he played the saxophone part at the 1966 premiere of Tcherepnin's Morning After Piece. In 1967, Schmidt performed several Fluxus-style diagrammatic scores, and published by Hans Wewerka under a title Album für Mogli, affectionate nickname for his spouse. Album für Mogli has been organized as a set of thirteen-sheet manuscript, supposed to be stacked in any order by any number of musicians. The score's composition "Hexapussy" premiered in Frankfurt the same year, played on metallic sound-sculptures created by the Baschet Brothers. Other titles included" "Oiml(g): Nightmares", "Gagaku", "Für Jackson MacLow", "Erinnerung", "Dieter's Lullaby", "Nada", "Prinzipien", and other. "Hexapussy" was the only recording that survived, appearing on the soundtrack composed by his future band Can for 1969 film Agilok & Blubbo.

On a number of occasions, Schmidt was asked to give talks or perform avant-garde music at gallery openings organized by Albert Schulze-Vellinghausen. Schulze-Vellinghausen, in turn, acquainted Schmidt with interior designer and up-in-coming gallerist Hans Mayer.

=== Can ===
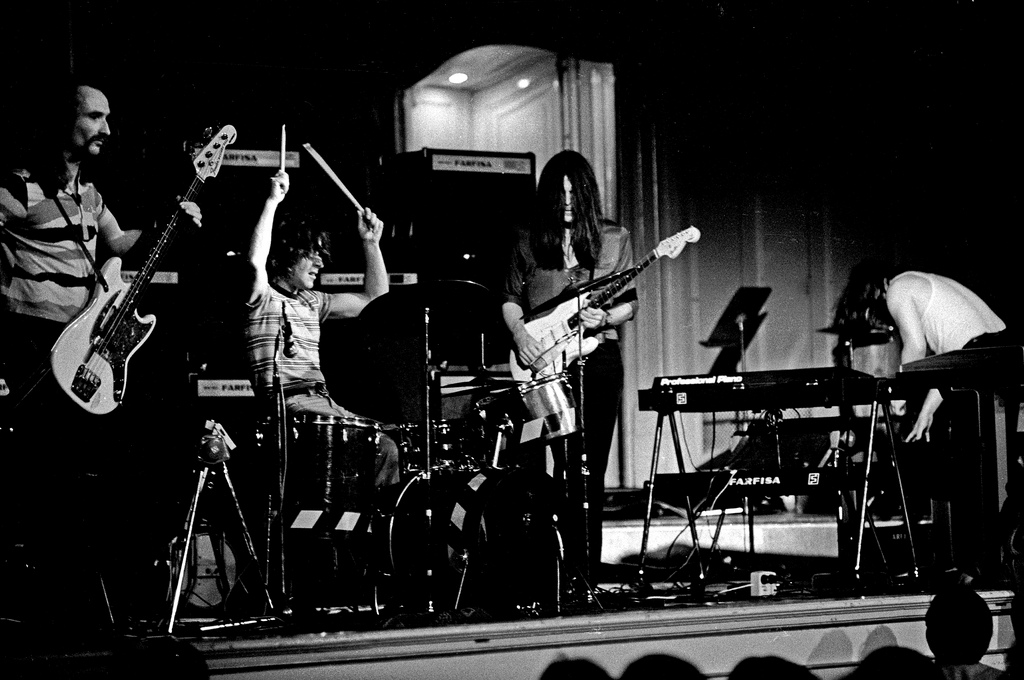
Schmidt (far right) performing with Can at Mushalle Hamburg, 1972

In the autumn of 1967, Schmidt wrote a letter to his friend, composer Holger Czukay, inviting him to Cologne and suggesting they should form a band. In 1968, in the midst of the student movement, Schmidt co-formed the Inner Space band (later known as Can) with Czukay, Michael Karoli, Jaki Liebezeit, and Johnson. Schmidt took part in the band's concerts and recording sessions, playing keyboards, until the group disbanded in 1979. He participated in the band's reunions in 1986, 1991, and 1999. He later commented on their relation to the political movement of 1968, saying the band wasn't involved in the movement, "physically or even theoretically, but was a reflection of the ongoing tumult that rejected any overt political affiliations".

Early in 1968, Schmidt received a commission to provide music for 1969 film Agilok & Blubbo at the recommendation of Hans Wewerka who worked as the film's producer. Around May, he had made a loose sketch of the soundtrack, aided by David C. Johnson, and eventually decided to invite his new band to play on the project, which became their first released recording. When searching for a base for the new group, he had "put the word out among his art world friends", and German literary scholar Hans Mayer responded, redirecting him to their joint acquaintance, art collector Christoph Vohwinkel. Vohwinkel had recently leased a historic castle, Schloss Nörvenich, on the outskirts of Cologne and planned to repurpose it as an artistic commune. He invited the band to stay at the castle rent-free for a year. Around 1975–1977, Schmidt had an affair with a psychotherapist from Paris who would sometimes join him on tour. The affair ended in early 1977 after Czukay told Hildegard about it, and Schmidt and Hildegard reconciled, but according to Schmidt the incident left "something broken between [them]". It also intensified tension between him and Czukay, which contributed to fragmentation within Can.

Can officially disbanded in January 1979, which, on his part, Schmidt attributed to dissatisfaction with their music direction and desire to spend more time with his wife and a daughter, who at the time was ten years old. In the aftermath, Schmidt started his solo career, but continued to collaborate with former bandmates. In 1986, he invited Liebezeit and Karoli, as well as Manfred Schoof and Gerd Dudek, to record his solo album, Musk at Dusk, that would be released the following year. The same year, the original Can roster reunited to record their final album Rite Time, released two years later in 1989.

Schmidt took part in the Can Solo Projects concerts in 1999, where each Can member showcased their individual musical projects, with Schmidt appearing as part of a duo with his son-in-law, British electronic musician Kumo, who usually played lyrical piano to ambient accompaniment, as well as rapid techno with "untempered noise and rich timbral effects". The final Can recording was a contribution to Pop 2000 – Das gibt's nur einmal (1999) released by Grönland Records, a compilation containing cover versions of significant Deutsche songs from the twentieth century. Can, sans Czukay, provided an electronic take on the theme from 1949 movie The Third Man. On 8 April 2017, Schmidt co-organized The Can Project, a show at the Barbican Centre, including Can Dialog, a tribute medley performed by the London Symphony Orchestra, written by Gregor Schwellenbach, and conducted by Schmidt.

=== Film and televisions scores, and later works ===
Schmidt has scored more than 100 films and television programs, including Knife in the Head (1978) and Palermo Shooting (2008). He has recorded a few solo albums and written an opera, Gormenghast, based on Mervyn Peake's Gormenghast Trilogy. The opera premiered at the Opernhaus Wuppertal in 1998, and its excerpts were released on Spoon Records in 1999. Wolk, in his review for CMJ New Music Monthly, highlighted Schmidt's background as both classical composer and rock musician as the key for Gormenghast succeeding as a good contemporary opera. Villa Wunderbar, released on 4 November 2013, compiles soundtrack compositions recorded by Schmidt between early 1980s and 2009. The first side was described by AllMusic as a mix of "demented cinematic romp", "bubbling" synthesisers, and left-field ambience. Mute Records/Spoon Records reissued Schmidt's work as the Electro Violet box set, containing his solo albums, as well as TV and film music. Record Collector gave it a rating of four out of four stars.

In 2018, Schmidt and British writer and editor Rob Young published a biography book on Can entitled All Gates Open: The Story of Can. Schmidt played the Huddersfield Contemporary Music Festival at the end of 2019, releasing the performance as a live album Nocturne in May 2020. One of the compositions was originally recorded for his 2018 album, 5 Klavierstück. Ian Rushbury, writing for PopMatters, likened Schmidt's performance on Nocturne to John Cage and Stockhausen, but felt that in comparison to most of his previous work Nocturne could captivate only "the most diehard of devotees".

Schmidt announced his next album, Requiem, released on 24 April 2026 via Mute Records and Future Days Music (Spoon Records) on vinyl, CD and digital formats. Requiem slowly unfolds with two long movements composed out of environmental recordings, including sounds of rushing water and the calls of birds, frogs, and insects, overdubbed with prepared and unprepared piano. According to AllMusic review, Requiem reflects on loss and commemoration, as well as nature themes.

=== Personal life ===
Schmidt began a relationship with Hildegard Reittenberger after performing at an East German music festival in 1957. The couple married six years later in 1963. They have a daughter, Sandra, born in April 1970, and a grandson Tom born in 2003.

Hildegard Schmidt became Can's manager in 1972, after they fired their previous manager, Abi Ofarim. In 1979, she established the record label, Spoon Records, taking control of the copyright of the Can discography. As of 2021, Schmidt lived between Germany and Provence for over forty years.

== Awards ==
Schmidt received the Ordre des Arts et des Lettres (Chevalier) in 2015 and Order of Merit of the Federal Republic of Germany in late 2025, awarded by mayor of Cologne Henriette Reker in recognition of his outstanding contribution to the arts and culture.

== Discography ==
=== Solo ===
- Filmmusik (1980)
- Filmmusik, Vol. 2 (1981)
- Toy Planet (1981) with Bruno Spoerri
- Filmmusik, Vols. 3 & 4 (1983)
- Rote Erde (1983) soundtrack
- Musk at Dusk (1987)
- Filmmusik Vol. 5 (1989)
- Impossible Holidays (1991)
- Soundtracks 1978–1993 (1994)
- Gormenghast (2000)
- Masters of Confusion (2001) with Kumo
- Flies, Guys and Choirs (2008) DVD with Kumo
- Axolotl Eyes (2008) with Kumo
- Palermo Shooting (2008) soundtrack
- Filmmusik Anthology, Volume 4 & 5 (2009)
- Villa Wunderbar (2013), 2-CD compilation, sleeve notes by Wim Wenders
- Filmmusik Anthology Volume 6 (2015)
- 5 Klavierstücke (2018)
- Nocturne (Live at Huddersfield Contemporary Music Festival) (2020)
- Requiem (2026)

=== With Can ===
- Monster Movie (1969)
- Tago Mago (1971)
- Ege Bamyasi (1972)
- Future Days (1973)
- Soon Over Babaluma (1974)
- Landed (1975)
- Flow Motion (1976)
- Saw Delight (1977)
- Out of Reach (1978)
- Can (1979)
- Rite Time (1989)

== Videography ==
- Romantic Warriors IV: Krautrock (2019)
