= Can discography =

- Studio albums: 11
- Soundtrack albums: 9
- Compilation albums: 7
- Singles: 12
- Video albums: 7

This is a discography of the krautrock band Can.

== Studio albums ==
- Monster Movie (1969)
- Tago Mago (1971)
- Ege Bamyasi (1972)
- Future Days (1973)
- Soon Over Babaluma (1974)
- Landed (1975)
- Flow Motion (1976)
- Saw Delight (1977)
- Out of Reach (1978)
- Can (1979)
- Rite Time (1989)

== Studio compilation albums ==
- Soundtracks (1970)
- Unlimited Edition (1976)
- Delay 1968 (1981)
- The Peel Sessions (1995)
- Agilok & Blubbo (2009)
- Kamasutra: Vollendung der Liebe (2009)
- The Lost Tapes (2012)
- The Singles (2017)

== Live albums ==
- Can Live Music (Live 1971–1977) (Spoon, 1999) – collection of live recordings 1972–1977 (originally packaged with the Can Box CD/video/book set)
- Live in Stuttgart 1975 (Spoon/Mute, 2021) – CD or 3-LP or digital
- Live in Brighton 1975 (Spoon/Mute, 2021) – 2-CD or 3-LP or digital
- Live in Cuxhaven 1976 (Spoon/Mute, 2022) – CD or LP or digital
- Live in Paris 1973 (Spoon/Mute, 2024) – 2-CD or 2-LP or digital
- Live in Aston 1977 (Spoon/Mute, 2024) – CD or LP or digital
- Live in Keele 1977 (Spoon/Mute, 2024) – CD or 2-LP or digital
- Live in Arles 1975 (Spoon/Mute, 2026) – CD or 2-LP or digital

== Other releases ==
- Onlyou (1982)
- Prehistoric Future (1985)
- Sacrilege (1997)

== Compilations ==
- Limited Edition (United Artists, 1974) – collection of 1968–1974 rarities that was expanded to become Unlimited Edition
- Opener (Sunset, 1976) – compilation from 1972–1974 album material
- Cannibalism (United Artists, 1978) – compilation from 1969–1974 album material (two tracks dropped for CD reissue)
- InCANdescence (Virgin, 1981) – compilation from 1969–1977 album material
- Cannibalism 2 (Spoon, 1992) – compilation from 1974–1981 album material, also includes a two tracks from singles and one unreleased track, "Melting Away"
- Cannibalism 3 (Spoon, 1993) – compilation from 1979–1991 solo album material
- Anthology (Spoon, 1994) – compilation from 1968–1991 album and soundtrack material

== Bootlegs ==
- Mother Sky (Asteroid, 1993) – live Waldbühne, West-Berlin June 1971
- Horrortrip in the Paperhouse: Live 1972/73 (1994).
- Radio Waves (Sonic Platten, 1997) – collection of 1969–1972 live and rare recordings
- Zhengzheng Rikang (Nörvenich, 2006) – early 1969 bootleg

== Singles ==
- "Agilok & Blubbo" {Can as The Inner Space} / "Kamera Song" (Rosemarie Heinikel) (Deutsche Vogue, DV 14785 – 1968)
- "Kama Sutra" {Irmin Schmidt with The Inner Space} / "I'm Hiding my Nightingale" (Margarete Juvan) (Metronome, M 25128 – November 1968)
- "Soul Desert" / "She Brings The Rain" (Liberty 15 340, 1970)
- "Turtles Have Short Legs"/"Halleluhwah" (Liberty, March 1971)
- "Spoon"/"Shikako Maru Ten" (United Artists, December 1971)
- "Vitamin C"/"I'm So Green" (United Artists, 1972)
- "Moonshake"/"Splash" (United Artists, October 1973)
- "Dizzy Dizzy"/"Come Sta La Luna" (United Artists, December 1974)
- "Hunters and Collectors"/"Vernal Equinox" (Virgin, 1975)
- "I Want More"/"..and More" (Virgin, July 1976) (reached No 26 in UK, October 1976)
- "Silent Night"/"Cascade Waltz" (Virgin, November 1976)
- "Don't Say No"/"Return" (Virgin, April 1977)
- "Can-Can"/"Can Be" (Lightning, June 1978)
- "Can-Can"/"Aspectacle" (Harvest, 1979)
- "Hoolah Hoolah" (Double-Mix)/"Hoolah Hoolah" (Sun Electric Mix) (Phonogram, 1990)
- "I Want More"/"..and More" (Spoon, 2006 reissue)
- "Stuttgart 75 Fünf (Excerpt)" (2021)

== Appearances on compilations ==
Compilation albums or albums by other artists containing previously unreleased Can tracks.

- Electric Rock Idee 2000 (Liberty/United Artists, 1970) – "Thief"; different edit appears later on Delay 1968
- Until the End of the World. Music from the Motion Picture Soundtrack (Warner Bros. Records, 1991) – "Last Night Sleep"
- Pop 2000. Das Gibt's Nur Einmal (Grönland Records, 1999) – "Der Dritte Mann"
- Irmin Schmidt: Villa Wunderbar (Spoon Records, 2013) – "Alice – Remix" and "Last Night Sleep – Remix"

== Film and video ==
- (1970) Mein schönes kurzes Leben (TV-Movie by Klaus Lemke)
- (1971) Beat Club TV (performance of "Paperhouse")
- (1972) Free Concert
- (1973) Mixed Media in Soest
- (1998) The Can Documentary
- (1999) The Can Box (Box set including The Can Documentary, Free Concert, two live CDs, and a book)
- (2004) The Can DVD (2 DVDs with Can material and 1 Audio CD with the solo material)
- (2019) Romantic Warriors IV: Krautrock
- (2022) Can and Me

== Soundtracks ==
- (1968) Agilok & Blubbo
- (1968) Kamasutra: Vollendung der Liebe
- (1969) The Brutes
- (1969) Kuckucksei im Gangsternest
- (1970) Das Millionenspiel
- (1970) Deadlock
- (1970) Deep End
- (1970) A Big Grey-Blue Bird
- (1970) Cream – Schwabing-Report
- (1970) Mein schönes kurzes Leben
- (1971) Das Messer
- (1972) Tatort – Dead Pigeon on Beethoven Street
- (1974) The Last Days of Gomorrah
- (1974) Alice in the Cities
- (1975) Eurogang
- (1979) Als Diesel geboren
- (1991) Until the End of the World

=== Non-original soundtracks ===
- (2002) Morvern Callar
- (2010) Norwegian Wood
- (2014) Inherent Vice
