= The Singles (Can album) =

Compilation album by Can
- Released: 16 June 2017
- Recorded: 1968–1986
- Genre: Krautrock
- Length: 79:25
- Label: Mute; Spoon
- Producer: Can

Can chronology
The Lost Tapes (2012)	The Singles (2017)	Stuttgart 1975 (2020)

Professional ratings
Review scores
Source	Rating
AllMusic	4/5 stars
Clash	7/10
The Independent	4/5 stars
Pitchfork	6.4/10

The Singles is a compilation album of singles and B-sides by the German experimental rock band Can, released in 2017.

== Critical reception ==
The Quietus wrote that "as a collection that welcomes the near misses and the questionable latter-era caricaturing, The Singles is real and admirable testament to the full Can story."

== Track listing ==
Side A
No.	Title	Original album	Length
1.	"Soul Desert" (1969)	Soundtracks (1970)	3:52
2.	"She Brings the Rain" (1969)	Soundtracks	4:07
3.	"Spoon" (1971)	Ege Bamyasi (1972)	3:06
4.	"Shikako Maru Ten" (1971)	Non-album B-side (1971)	3:18

Side B
No.	Title	Original album	Length
5.	"Turtles Have Short Legs" (1971)	Non-album single (1971)	3:25
6.	"Halleluwah" (Edit) (1971)	Tago Mago (1971)	3:38
7.	"Vitamin C" (1972)	Ege Bamyasi	3:33
8.	"I'm So Green" (1972)	Ege Bamyasi	3:05

Side C
No.	Title	Original album	Length
9.	"Mushroom" (1972)	Tago Mago	4:01
10.	"Moonshake" (1973)	Future Days (1973)	3:02
11.	"Future Days" (Edit) (1973)	Future Days	3:24
12.	"Dizzy Dizzy" (Edit) (1974)	Soon Over Babaluma (1974)	3:30

Side D
No.	Title	Original album	Length
13.	"Splash" (Edit) (1974)	Soon Over Babaluma	4:04
14.	"Hunters and Collectors" (Edit) (1975)	Landed (1975)	3:23
15.	"Vernal Equinox" (Edit) (1975)	Landed	3:11
16.	"I Want More" (1976)	Flow Motion (1976)	3:32

Side E
No.	Title	Original album	Length
17.	"...And More (Single Version)" (1976)	Flow Motion	3:20
18.	"Silent Night" (1976)	Non-album single (1976)	3:13
19.	"Cascade Waltz (Single Version)" (1976)	Flow Motion	3:37

Side F
No.	Title	Original album	Length
20.	"Don't Say No" (Edit) (1977)	Saw Delight (1977)	3:19
21.	"Return" (1977)	Non-album track (1977)	3:06
22.	"Can Can" (1978)	Can (1979)	3:11
23.	"Hoolah Hoolah" (Remix Edit) (1990)	Rite Time (1989)	3:28
