= Damo Suzuki discography =

The Japanese musician Damo Suzuki performed on the following incomplete list of albums and soundtracks:

== With Damo Suzuki's Network ==
- Tokyo on Air West 30.04.97 (1997)
- Tokyo on Air West 02.05.97 (1997)
- Osaka Muse Hall 04.05.97 (1997)
- V.E.R.N.I.S.S.A.G.E. (1998) (as "Damo Suzuki Band")
- P.R.O.M.I.S.E. (7CD Box) (1998) (as "Damo Suzuki Band")
- Seattle (1999)
- Odyssey (2000)
- JPN ULTD Vol.1 (2000)
- Metaphysical Transfer (2001)
- JPN ULTD Vol.2 (2002)
- Hollyaris (2005)
- 3 Dead People After The Performance (2005)
- Tutti i colori del silenzio (2006)
- Suomi (2006)
- The Fire Of Heaven At The End Of Universe (Life At UFO Club) (2007) (as "Damo Suzuki")
- Sette Modi Per Salvare Roma (2011)
- Seven Potatoes: Live in Nanaimo (2013) (as "Damo Suzuki")
- The Swiftsure Session (2017)
- Start Soft (2017)

== With Can ==
- Soundtracks (1970)
- Tago Mago (1971)
- Ege Bamyası (1972)
- Future Days (1973)
- Unlimited Edition (1976) (Compilation)
- The Peel Sessions (1995)
- The Lost Tapes (2012) (Compilation)

== With Dunkelziffer ==
- In The Night (1984)
- III (1986)
- Live 1985 (1997)

== With Mugstar ==
- Start From Zero (2015)
- Live at The Invisible Wind Factory (2020)

== Other collaborations ==
- Cul De Sac / Damo Suzuki – Abhayamudra (2004)
- Sixtoo – Chewing on Glass & Other Miracle Cures (2004)
- Damo Suzuki & Now – The London Evening News (2006) (CD)
- Omar Rodriguez-Lopez & Damo Suzuki – Please Heat This Eventually (2007)
- Safety Magic – Voices (2007)
- Audioscope – Music for a Good Home (2010) (CD)
- Damo Suzuki & The Holy Soul – Dead Man Has No 2nd Chance (2010) (CD)
- Damo Suzuki & Cuzo – Puedo Ver Tu Mente (2011) (CD/LP)
- Damo Suzuki & Congelador – Damo Suzuki + Congelador (2011)
- Damo Suzuki & God Don't Like It Ensemble – Live At Cafe Oto (2011)
- Radio Massacre International – Lost in Transit 4: DAMO (2010) (CD)
- Simon Torssell Lerin / Bettina Hvidevold Hystad with Damo Suzuki – Simon Torssell Lerin / Bettina Hvidevold Hystad with Damo Suzuki (2013) (Vinyl Box Set including Book and LP)
- Damo Suzuki & Øresund Space Collective – Damo Suzuki møder Øresund Space Collective (2014) (Digital and 3×LP)
- 1-A Düsseldorf – Uraan (2016) (2×CD, Album)
- Damo Suzuki & Black Midi – Live at the Windmill Brixton with 'Sound Carriers' (2018) (Digital)
- Damo Suzuki & Jelly Planet – Glocksee (2020) (2×LP. Released by Catweezle Records)
- Damo Suzuki, Echo Ensemble – Live at the Green Door Store (2020) (CD. Released by Willkommen Records)
- Damo Suzuki with Numinous Eye & Steve Eto – High School Pharmacy!!! (2021) (LP. Released by Charnel Music)
- Damo Suzuki & Spiritczualic Enhancement Center – Arkaoda (2022) (LP. Released by Akuphone)
