= Live in Paris 1973 =

Live album by Can
- Released: February 23, 2024
- Recorded: 12 May 1973
- Venues: L'Olympia, Paris, France
- Genre: Krautrock
- Length: 91:14
- Label: Spoon

Can chronology
Live in Cuxhaven 1976 (2022)	Live in Paris 1973 (2024)	Live in Aston 1977 (2024)

Live in Paris 1973 is a live double-album by German krautrock band Can, recorded at a performance of the band at L'Olympia in Paris, France. It was released on vinyl and CD by Spoon Records on 23 February 2024, two weeks after the death of Can member Damo Suzuki on 9 February 2024.

Live in Paris 1973 is the fourth live album in a series prepared by Can founding member Irmin Schmidt and producer/engineer René Tinner, and the first official live release to feature vocalist Suzuki. The live performance features Schmidt, Holger Czukay, Michael Karoli, Jaki Liebezeit and Suzuki. It was one of the last concerts Suzuki performed in with Can. He left the band soon after Future Days was recorded. Schmidt and Tinner went on to assemble two additional Can live albums in 2024. (Note: The six live albums prepared by Irmin Schmidt and René Tinner are Live in Stuttgart 1975 (2021), Live in Brighton 1975 (2021), Live in Cuxhaven 1976 (2022), Live in Paris 1973 (2024), Live in Aston 1977 (2024) and Live in Keele 1977 (2024).)

== Music ==
The material on Live in Paris 1973 was sourced from tapes archived at Spoon Records, plus concert recordings by British fan, Andrew Hall. Bootleg recordings of this concert of varying quality have circulated for many years; for this official release, however, the audio quality of the source tapes was restored and enhanced by engineer and producer René Tinner.

The five track titles on the album are numbered in German: “Eins” (“One”), “Zwei” (“Two”), "Drei" (Three"), “Vier” (“Four”) and "Fünf" ("Five"). The music is improvised, with three of the tracks, "Zwei", "Drei" and "Fünf" being improvised extensions of three Can songs, "One More Night", "Spoon" and "Vitamin C" respectively. The songs are from their 1972 album Ege Bamyasi, which had been released sixth months before the L'Olympia concert.

== Reception ==
Professional ratings
Review scores
Source	Rating
AllMusic	4.5/5 stars
Financial Times	4/5 stars
Mojo	4/5 stars
Record Collector	5/5 stars

In the contemporary review of the Paris concert, Paul Alessandrini of the Rock & Folk magazine described the music as "by turns savage, flamboyant, anguished, frenetic. An avant-garde music, since it uses absolutely all the possibilities of sound, but which constantly remembers to appeal to the body, to the dance."

Paul Simpson, reviewing the album for AllMusic, wrote that "Live in Paris 1973 is Can at their on-stage best, and easily the band's most essential live release." He called the band's improvisation around "Vitamin C" on "Paris 73 Fünf", "an extended freak-out", while "Paris 73 Zwei"'s reworking of "One More Night" showed their "mastery of killer grooves". Simpson described the album as "a largely unfiltered display of the band's powers when they were at their prime".

Reviewing the album in Mojo magazine, Ian Harrison called Live in Paris 1973 "the most astonishing" of the series of four live archival releases so far. He wrote that Ege Bamyasi had just been released, and "Can were firing creatively and commercially", making this "one of the great[est] formations in Can's history".

Ludovic Hunter-Tilney of the Financial Times described Live in Paris 1973 as "a vivid tribute to [Suzuki's] role in one of the best improvisational groups in rock's history." Hunter-Tilney stated that following the successes of Tago Mago and Ege Bamyasi, Can were "at the height of their powers." He said their long jams in Paris that night were "mesmerising", and Suzuki was often another instrument, "wailing with the guitar or barking chopped-up phrases in time to the rhythms." Hunter-Tilney added that while Suzuki "didn't like to look back", this album "allows us to do so, with gratitude".

Sylvain Siclier wrote in a review of the album in Le Monde that Can's rendering of "Vitamin C" in "Fünf" is "beautiful" (belles), and added that Suzuki is "wonderful" (merveilleux) here. Janne Oinonen wrote in The Yorkshire Post that Can "excelled in 'regressive rock', with the musicians scaling back every ounce of flab to arrive at a pure essence of groove that unveils a lean, fiercely potent European brand of avant-funk." Oinonen called Live in Paris 1973 "electrifying", adding that despite being 50-year-old recordings, "it's difficult to think of a more timelessly fresh live album being released in 2024."

== Track listing ==
All tracks composed by Irmin Schmidt, Holger Czukay, Michael Karoli, Jaki Liebezeit and Damo Suzuki.

=== Double-LP release ===
Side A
No.	Title	Length
1.	"Paris 73 Eins (Part 1)"

Side B
No.	Title	Length
1.	"Paris 73 Eins (Part 2)"

Side C
No.	Title	Length
1.	"Paris 73 Zwei"
2.	"Paris 73 Drei"

Side D
No.	Title	Length
1.	"Paris 73 Vier"
2.	"Paris 73 Fünf"

=== Double-CD release ===
CD 1
No.	Title	Length
1.	"Paris 73 Eins"	36:27
2.	"Paris 73 Zwei"	9:20

CD 2
No.	Title	Length
1.	"Paris 73 Drei"	16:35
2.	"Paris 73 Vier"	15:09
3.	"Paris 73 Fünf"	13:46

Source: Liner notes

== Personnel ==
- Irmin Schmidt – keyboards, synthesiser
- Holger Czukay – bass guitar
- Michael Karoli – guitar
- Jaki Liebezeit – drums
- Damo Suzuki – vocals

Sound and production

- Compiled and edited by Irmin Schmidt and René Tinner
- Mastered by Andreas Torkler and Dieter Denzer
- Artwork and design by Uschi Siebauer
- Liner notes by Wyndham Wallace

Source: Liner notes
