= Ege Bamyasi =

Ege Bamyası

Studio album by Can
- Released: 29 November 1972
- Recorded: December 1971 – June 1972
- Studios: Inner Space Studio, Weilerswist, West Germany
- Genres: Krautrock; avant-funk; psychedelic rock; space rock
- Length: 40:06
- Label: United Artists
- Producer: Can

Can chronology
Tago Mago (1971)	Ege Bamyası (1972)	Future Days (1973)

Singles from Ege Bamyası
- 1. "Spoon" Released: 1971; 2. "Vitamin C" / "I'm So Green" Released: 1972

Ege Bamyası (Turkish for 'Aegean okra') (Note: Turkish pronunciation: [ˈeɟe ˈbamjasɯ]) is the third studio album by the German Krautrock band Can, released in November 1972 by United Artists Records. It contains the single "Spoon", which charted in the Top 10 on the German singles chart after its inclusion as the theme song to the German television mini-series Das Messer (1971). The success of the single allowed Can to establish their own studio, Inner Space Studio, in Weilerswist, where they completed the rest of the album. It was recorded and produced under a strict June 1972 deadline, finishing "Soup" a day before the end date.

Ege Bamyası was met with critical acclaim, praised for skilful fusion of experimental music, electronic sounds, and avant-funk. Spectrum Sounds magazine called the album's experience as "maybe the most danceable that experimental music gets". Retrospective reviews highlighted that the album stands out among Can discography for being one of the band's most focused and tense records. The album helped popularize krautrock and inspired later musicians including Brian Eno, Sonic Youth, the Orb, Wire, Pavement, and System 7, some of whom participated in the Can tribute remix album Sacrilege (1997). In later decades, publications such as Rolling Stone and NME ranked Ege Bamyası as one of Can's best albums and among the best albums of all time.

== Background ==
In December 1971, Can had relocated their Inner Space Studio out of the communal space of the Schloss Nörvenich, where recording sessions were time-limited due to noise concerns, and moved into a large ex-cinema in Weilerswist near Cologne. Hildegard Schmidt, Can's manager, outfitted the studio with fifteen hundred seagrass mattresses bought from army barracks at Cologne-Ossendorf to serve as soundproofing. Keyboardist Irmin Schmidt, previously using two Farfisa organs, acquired a complex effects unit custom-built by Swiss engineer Hermi Hogg. Dubbed the "Alpha 77", the unit allowed "far greater degrees of spontaneity in the way Schmidt handled his synthesizers".

Ege Bamyası became the first Can album recorded in the Weilerswist Inner Space, starting with the song "Spoon". After their success with Das Millionenspiel (1970) soundtrack, the band were commissioned to record the theme song for a future television series directed by Rolf von Sydow, titled Das Messer (The Knife). According to bassist Holger Czukay, the song's name was chosen as "a companion to the knife, less aggressive".

"Spoon" rapidly climbed the German singles chart, reaching number six, and sold 300,000 copies, inspiring Can to throw a free concert "to give them a taste of what they had already been brewing up in Weilerswist". Peter Przygodda directed a film of the concert titled "Can Free Concert", shot by Martin Schäfer, Robbie Müller, and Egon Mann at the Cologne Sporthalle on 3 February 1972. The film was included on the "Can DVD".

In the first half of 1972, United Artists urged Can to capitalize on the success of "Spoon", requesting another 45 rpm single. Can released "Vitamin C" paired with a B-side song "I'm So Green". "Vitamin C" was chosen as the title track for 1972 German film Dead Pigeon on Beethoven Street.

== Production ==
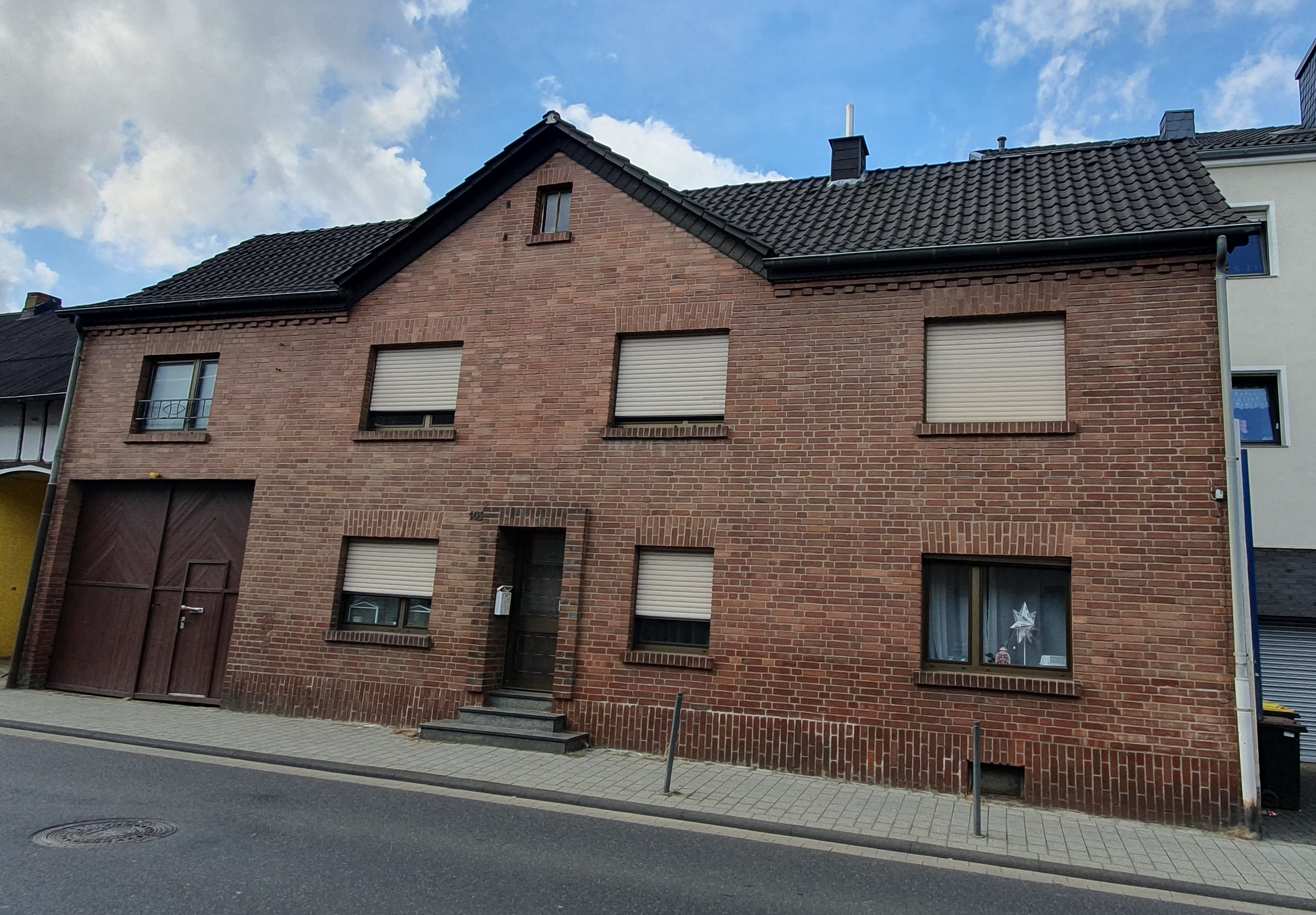
Inner Space Studio in Weilerswist in September 2023

The success of "Spoon" built momentum for Can, and Siggi Loch at United Artists pushed them to come up with a new album under a strict June deadline. Can had only a sparse collection of finished tracks and out-takes, and began a frantic recording process completing several tracks "practically in real time". According to guitarist Michael Karoli, the band's recording sessions were additionally haywired by Schmidt and vocalist Damo Suzuki who daily played chess. One day before the deadline, Can had recorded and edited only the three tracks that would comprise side one of the album ("Sing Swan Song", "One More Night", and "Pinch").

Karoli recorded the acoustic guitar part for "Sing Swan Song" in the outside-garden, because he could not hear himself against the drums. The previously recorded singles "Spoon", "Vitamin C", and "I'm So Green" were added to make up for a shortfall in material. However, the band still needed to fill side two. That afternoon they returned into the studio, and according to Can's biographer Rob Young, "abandoned themselves to a monstrous ten-minute improvisation which they vowed to include, whatever the outcome"; this track became the track "Soup". In a 2006 interview with David Stubbs in Uncut magazine, Schmidt recalled that "Soup" was completed without any edits. Czukay selected "Soup" as his favourite track. The album was edited by Czukay and Karoli.

== Composition ==
Critics characterized Ege Bamyası as a member of the krautrock genre with elements of avant-funk, psychedelic rock, and space rock. Czukay noticed that updated environment of the new studio influenced the sound, softening the drums, while the vocals and the rest of the instruments became distinctly separated in the mix. In addition to the instruments, reviewer Martin Hayman found that Suzuki's pidgin English vocals contribute to the album's sound, flowing in and out of songs with its unique texture.

Pitchfork compared the song "Pinch" to the music of Miles Davis' electric period, which likewise created a "tough, dissonant take on rock" that managed to remain "sparse enough as to be unsettling". "One More Night" is similarly dry in its arrangement and "efficient in the extreme", and has been compared to the work of American minimalist composer Steve Reich. "Sing Swan Song" has been described as "lullaby-like", flowing with a cradling, calming motion. Its contrast with the previous track, "Pinch", being more focused and "perfectly formed" as a "crisply cut diamond". "Vitamin C" is centered around "tightly wound" drums surrounded by marching instruments, including two melodramatic guitar chords and an epilogue organ, "trilling like an elvish wood flute". Pitchfork deemed it "the best funk ever to come out of Europe".

The psychedelic funk of "I'm So Green" was considered by Can's biographer Rob Young as a rather "throwaway" song, featuring a James Brown-esque backbeat and typical rhythm-guitar melody. Hayman described the song as "almost a vaudeville tune". Pitchfork characterized "Spoon" as "proto synth-pop (or synth-rock)"; AllMusic compared it to the early work of synth-pop acts Ultravox and Gary Numan.

== Release and promotion ==
Ege Bamyası was originally released in 1972 by United Artists. The label pressed 8,000 vinyl copies at the record's release. In September 2004, Spoon Records remastered and re-released the album, along with the majority of Can's discography, as a hybrid Super Audio CD. The re-released version included a booklet with David Stubbs' commentary on the album, as well as previously unreleased photos of the band.

In September 1972, Karoli was hospitalized with a perforated stomach ulcer, spending most of his time in recovery until the New Year. At the beginning of 1973, Hildegard Schmidt had booked upwards of thirty live dates for Can around the UK, Germany, and France for the upcoming winter and spring. Can spent a month touring Great Britain between the mid-February to the mid-March 1973, encompassing such cities as Newcastle upon Tyne, Stirling, Plymouth, Penzance, Chatham, Westcliff-on-Sea, Norwich, Birmingham, Kingston upon Hull, Leicester, and Bristol (Top Rank Suite). The band's show on 19 February at the Paris Theatre in London was recorded by BBC Radio and broadcast on their In Concert series. A day after the London show, Can attended the Langham Street studios to tape their first BBC session, aired on Top Gear on 13 March and hosted by DJ Anne Nightingale. The nineteen-minute track from this session resurfaced on the 1995 compilation album The Peel Sessions under the title "Up the Bakerloo Line with Anne". Several UK shows were supported by Gunner Kade, a short-lived outfit formed by ex-Groundhogs member Ken Pustelnik.

Four days after their last British date, at Bristol Top Rank, Can made their first live appearance in France. On March 22, 1973, they appeared on Pop 2, a prime television slot for live rock on France's national radio station. It was the show where Irmin debuted his lap steel guitar with sound treated by the Alpha 77. In April, the band briefly returned to West Germany, performing in Esslingen am Neckar, and in May they were back in Paris, playing at Bataclan and Olympia. Spoon Records released the recording of the Olympia show in 2024 as Live in Paris 1973. Two days after the Paris shows, Can played their last date at the Stadthalle in Heidelberg.

=== Cover artwork ===
The album cover shows a can of Ege Bamyası (Turkish for "Aegean okra"), translated to German as Okraschoten ("okra pods"). As Schmidt explained in 2006, the idea for the cover came after Liebezeit had found a similar can of okra in a Turkish grocery shop in Cologne. However, that particular design was patented, and the company had forbidden them from using it.

The cover also correlates with the band's name (can – pronounced [dʒan]), which in Turkish means "soul", "spirit", or "life". Moreover, the food-related theme of the artwork coincides with the song titles such as "Vitamin C", "Soup", "I'm So Green", and "Spoon".

== Reception ==
Professional ratings
Review scores
Source	Rating
AllMusic	5/5 stars
The Encyclopedia of Popular Music	5/5 stars
The Great Rock Discography	7/10
Mojo	5/5 stars
Music Story	5/5 stars
Pitchfork	9.8/10
Q	5/5 stars
The Rolling Stone Album Guide	4/5 stars
Spin Alternative Record Guide	8/10
Stylus Magazine	A

Ege Bamyası was met with critical acclaim from both contemporary and retrospective critics. The staff of Melody Maker wrote in a contemporary review that "Can are without doubt the most talented and most consistent experimental rock band in Europe, England included." Duncan Fallowell, writing for The Spectator in 1973, felt that the album had both the "extreme rhythmic physicality" of their debut Monster Movie and the "blood-curdling sophistication" of Tago Mago, accumulating into the band's "most approachable album so far".

The NME deputy editor, Ian MacDonald, reviewed the album in a less favorable light, calling Can "a unique band of intellectuals struggling to make people's music in a prevailing anti-cerebral climate and epitomize a central contradiction of German rock", performing "some good and some awful music, and look unusually happy for a bunch of incipient schizophrenics". Nevertheless, he complimented their honesty and articulation, adding that "the world is full of" people who would like the record. Sounds reviewer Martin Hayman remained unconvinced whether Can were the "revolutionary, hypnotic outfit" they were hyped as, finding its opaque sound to resemble "a rambling assay into electronic riffs", but on a closer listening "reveals a constant, shifting flow of musical improvisation". He compared each instrument to protons connected to a singular atom, "whizzing round on its own elliptical paths but controlled by its interaction with the magnetic centre".

In a 2005 retrospective review, Adrien Begrand of PopMatters characterized the album as "every bit as compact and tetchy as its predecessor was epic and spacey", calling it "a masterful piece of psychedelic rock fused with tightly wound funk". The staff of The Encyclopedia of Popular Music described Ege Bamyası as a major step in the band's development "from the edgy experimentalism of their earlier albums to the softer ambience of their later work". When "Soup" and "Pinch" represented their "wilder excesses", the songs such as "One More Night" and "Sing Swan Song" showcased Can's inventiveness with more compact and concentrated song structures, while "I'm So Green" and "Spoon" were "almost conventional pop songs". Jake Cole of Spectrum Culture believed the album's experience to be "maybe the most danceable that experimental music gets", and placed it at the midpoint between Miles Davis' albums Jack Johnson (1971) and On the Corner (1972). Pitchfork saw it as Can's most focused album, evaluating it at the top of their discography.

=== Accolades ===
In 2004, Ege Bamyasi was ranked 19th on Pitchfork magazine's list of the 100 Albums of the 1970s, while in the similar list, compiled by Fact in 2014, it was put at 97th position, and Paste magazine placed the album at 63rd position in 2020 list of the 70 Best Albums of the 1970s. In the 2004 list of 101–200 Albums of All Time, Stylus Magazine ranked Ege Bamyasi at number 113. In 2013, NME ranked it at number 297 among 500 Greatest Albums of All Time. In 2016, Uncut magazine ranked the album at number 75 among 200 Greatest Albums of All Time. In 2020 edition of Rolling Stone's 500 Greatest Albums of All Time, it was placed at number 454.

Accolades for Ege Bamyası
Year	Publication	Accolade	Rank	Ref.
2004	Pitchfork	"Top 100 Albums of the 1970s"	19	
2004	Stylus Magazine	"Top 101–200 Albums of All Time"	113	
2013	NME	"NME's The 500 Greatest Albums of All Time"	297	
2014	Fact	"The 100 best albums of the 1970s"	97	
2016	Uncut	"200 Greatest Albums of All Time"	75	
2020	Paste	"The 70 Best Albums of the 1970s"	63	
2020	Rolling Stone	"Rolling Stone's 500 Greatest Albums of All Time"	454	

== Legacy ==
=== Influence ===
Pascal Bussy, biographer of the German electronic band Kraftwerk, highlighted Can among the krautrock bands as the "primary group" who made an impact and influence the German music for decade.

A number of artists have cited Ege Bamyası as their influence. Stephen Malkmus of Pavement told Melody Maker in 1992 that he listened to the album "every night before [he] went to sleep for about three years". Thurston Moore of Sonic Youth recalled buying a record of Ege Bamyası, and not knowing anything about Can except the album cover, he "completely wore it out" and said "it was unlike anything else he was hearing at the time".

Geoff Barrow of Portishead picked Ege Bamyası as one of the band's thirteen favourite albums in a 2011 interview with The Quietus. The band Spoon took its name from the eponymous track on this album, and has cited Can as a major influence.

=== Covers, samples, and remixes ===
In February 1999, NME magazine announced "Can Forgery Series", a Can tribute album set for release in Spring 2000, would feature the song "I'm So Green" covered by Beck. Sacrilege (1997) includes remixed versions of "Vitamin C" and "Spoon", performed respectively by U.N.K.L.E. and Sonic Youth.

Kanye West sampled "Sing Swan Song" for his song "Drunk and Hot Girls" on the album Graduation (2007), and derives many of the song's lyrics from Suzuki's vocals. He later also sampled "Vitamin C" for his song "Losing Your Mind" on an EP promoting his album Bully (2026) in July 2025, only available through its original physical edition. In 2008, the Kleptones also incorporated "Vitamin C" into their mix "Hectic City 7 – May Daze". On 1 December 2012, Stephen Malkmus played Ege Bamyası in its entirety at WEEK-END Festival in Cologne, marking the album's 40th anniversary. The recording of this performance was released as a limited-edition Record Store Day LP in 2013.

=== In popular culture ===
"Vitamin C" has been prominently featured in film soundtracks, appearing in Pedro Almodóvar's 2009 film Broken Embraces, in Jonny Greenwood's soundtrack for 2014 film Inherent Vice, and in The Get Down: Original Soundtrack for the 2016 Netflix series of the same name. In addition to Das Messer (1971), "Spoon" appeared in the soundtrack to 2002 film Morvern Callar, while "I'm So Green" was used in the 2020 documentary Spaceship Earth. In the manga JoJo's Bizarre Adventure, the character Damo Tamaki has an ability named "Vitamin C".

== Track listing ==
All tracks are written by Can (Holger Czukay, Michael Karoli, Jaki Liebezeit, Irmin Schmidt, and Damo Suzuki).

Side one
No.	Title	Length
1.	"Pinch"	9:30
2.	"Sing Swan Song"	4:49
3.	"One More Night"	5:36

Side two
No.	Title	Length
4.	"Vitamin C"	3:32
5.	"Soup"	10:32
6.	"I'm So Green"	3:06
7.	"Spoon"	3:04
Total length:		40:06

== Personnel ==
=== Can ===
- Holger Czukay – bass guitar, engineering, editing
- Michael Karoli – electric guitar, acoustic guitar
- Jaki Liebezeit – drums
- Irmin Schmidt – Farfisa organ and electric piano, electronics (Alpha 77)
- Damo Suzuki – vocals

=== Production ===
- Ingo Trauer – original artwork
- Richard J. Rudow – original design
- Andreas Torkler – design (2004 re-release)
