= Moonshake (song) =

Song by Can

from the album Future Days
- B-side: "Future Days"
- Released: Late 1973
- Studio: Inner Space Studio (Weilerswist, West Germany)
- Genre: Psychedelic pop; funk; reggae
- Length: 3:04
- Label: United Artists; Spoon
- Producer: Can

Official audio
- "Moonshake" on YouTube

"Moonshake" is a song by the German krautrock band Can, released as a single from their 1973 album Future Days.

== Composition ==
Rob Young, Can's biographer, placed "Moonshake" alongside "She Brings the Rain" from Soundtracks and "Sing Swan Song" from Ege Bamyasi in the band's "catalogue of perfectly formed pop songs", incorporating "elements of rock convention and erasing any sense of cliché around them". "Moonshake" is the only track on Future Days that features the motorik rhythm propagated by the band on their previous albums.

== Reception and legacy ==
John Peel, reviewing the single for Sounds, described it as "great", but felt its chances to become a hit were "roughly comparable to his chances of being asked to join Ivy Benson's All-Girl Orchestra on harp". In 2017, Vice's Drew Millard described "Moonshake" as "pre-punk-post-punk sugar rush", relieving "all the meandering that comes before it [on Future Days]" and slipping away just as it begins.

Can incorporated the melody of "Moonshake" into "Don't Say No", the first song from their 1977 album Saw Delight.

The British experimental rock/post-rock band Moonshake took their name from this song.

== Personnel ==
(From album credits)

- Holger Czukay – bass guitar, double bass
- Michael Karoli – electric guitar, violin
- Jaki Liebezeit – drums, percussion, "melodica-type instrument"
- Irmin Schmidt – Farfisa organ and electric piano, electronics
- Damo Suzuki – vocals, percussion
