= Soon Over Babaluma =

Studio album by Can
- Released: November 1974
- Recorded: August 1974
- Studios: Inner Space Studio, Weilerswist, near Cologne
- Genres: Krautrock; ambient
- Length: 38:56
- Label: United Artists
- Producer: Can

Can chronology
Future Days (1973)	Soon Over Babaluma (1974)	Landed (1975)

Singles from Soon Over Babaluma
- 1. "Dizzy Dizzy / Come sta, La Luna" Released: 1974

Soon Over Babaluma is the fifth studio album by the rock music group Can, released in November 1974 by United Artists. This is the band's first album following the 1973 departure of their second vocalist Damo Suzuki. The vocals are provided by guitarist Michael Karoli and keyboardist Irmin Schmidt. It is also their last album that was created using a two-track tape recorder.

It takes the ambient style of Future Days and pushes it even further at times, as on "Quantum Physics", although there are also some upbeat tracks, such as "Chain Reaction" and "Dizzy Dizzy".

== Background and production ==
After the departure of the band's vocalist Damo Suzuki, Can auditioned several singers to fill the role of Suzuki, but eventually decided their guitarist Michael Karoli would take over vocals on most songs, with keyboardist Irmin Schmidt singing on "Come sta, la luna". Karoli later recalled that someone should fill the role of a vocalist, because he "thought, or we [Can] thought, that there had to be somebody singing: it was necessary for the music". Karoli added that he "never enjoyed singing"; never getting "into a state where I was actually singing the way I play guitar, where the thing happened which Desse and Damo both did. They were drifting in the music, and using their voices, and I never did that."

The word "Babaluma" came out of a conversation between Schmidt and Jaki Liebezeit about words, where Liebezeit misheard a sentence said by Schmidt and asking him "what did you say? Babaluma?" Schmidt liked the word, admiring its rhyme with the word "luna" and describing it as "true surrealism". He explained the title, Soon Over Babaluma, as an event taking place in space; "seeing the moon and, from there, soon being over Babaluma – which must be another star or something".

The cover art-collage was done by Ulli Eichberger, depicting a blue-black three-dimensional landscape of a mountain range lit by a distant star.

== Composition ==
Karoli sings on "Dizzy Dizzy" with particular attention to percussive sibilants, the "T" and "S" sounds, which "entwine with the artificial hi-hats of a rhythm concocted by Schmidt using his slide guitar and a delay effect on the Alpha 77". Pitchfork reviewer saw "Dizzy Dizzy" as "something like Can's version of ska" and one of their best attempts at world music.

"Come sta, la luna" is a "solemn mechanical tango that suggests a drowsy fiddler perambulating from table to table, punctuated at times with neo-romantic flourishes at the bottom end of the grand piano". It uses a field recording loaned from the department of the WDR sound effects library, giving the song a "nineteenth-century palm court ambience", and a cawing raven gave the sound a "note of nocturnal melodrama". Pitchfork reviewer described it as a "murky electro-bossa".

The song "Chain Reaction" was characterized as a "premonition of tribal trance", and its intro compared to "dirt bikes roving across a Martian rockscape". At the 3:44 mark the energy culminates to an "excess and the track bursts into a disciplined 3/4 plod". Rob Young deemed the track to be unofficial part of Ethnic Forgery Series ("EFS"), the series of tracks recorded by Can while inspired by world music.

"Quantum Physics" starts out in a major key, switching to a minor key at the 4:25 mark with an "unearthly chord hissing across the sound space". The switch was compared by Young to a blind stumbling from the unknown into a "sense of a certain, ordained destination". The final twenty-second drone was described as "anticipating thousands of electronic ambient recordings to come".

=== Lyrics ===
English novelist and a friend of Can, Duncan Fallowell, supplied the lyrics for the songs "Dizzy Dizzy" and "Quantum Physics". Fallowell wrote "a lot" of them, and sent "quite a sheaf" to Karoli, describing his writing style as "very much into free association in a kind of fractalized way". Irmin Schmidt came up with the lyrics for the song "Come sta, la luna", "sung-spoken" by both Schmidt and Karoli "through a slithery phasing effect". However, he has never written the lyrics down, and years later couldn't "remember the words any more". The song takes its name from the phrase written down by Leonardo da Vinci in his 1503 notebook, and Young bridged a comparison between the name of the song, da Vinci's dream of flight, and the concept of the album.

Schmidt felt that "Come sta, la luna" was in a way about Christine, Liebezeit's girlfriend of the time who often sat on the studio sofa with "accustomed stillness" and "mysterious aura around her". When Schmidt was writing the lyrics down, "Dancer on the rope, in the space", she was sitting in the studio, and Schmidt "found her very mysterious and very beautiful".

On "Chain Reaction" Karoli sings the words deciphered by Young as "Elephant/Dominating … Russian mistress". The lyrics for "Quantum Physics" feature a phrase "Dreaming in the autumn".

== Release and promotion ==
The Ian MacDonald interview with Can came out on the back of Soon Over Babaluma vinyl sleeve, mostly focusing on recounting the group's history and prehistory, and "glossing the newest material in three final paragraphs". Following the release, Can sent out autographed promotional postcards, featuring the portrait photos of the band printed on the back cover of Soon Over Babaluma.

On 27 September 1974, Can began a sixteen-date UK tour, which ended at the Hammersmith Palais "advertised in the music press as playing for three hours, and included a twenty-five-minute jam on 'Chain Reaction'". Additionally, they recorded a mid-tour session at the BBC's Maida Vale Studios, producing the songs that would later be called "Return to BB City" and "Tape Kebab".

Can performed "Quantum Physics" at Brighton show in 1975, which was adapted as a live album Live in Brighton 1975 released in 2021.

== Reception ==
In a contemporary NME review, Nick Kent was nonplussed by the album, saying that a "deal of the music here does tend to fall on stony ground, being ultimately rendered fairly obsolete", putting "Quantum Physics" as "defiantly impenetrable at this juncture that I daren't make some dogmatic statement concerning its merits". He compared Soon Over Babaluma to the Beatles' song "Baby, You're a Rich Man" and to the music of the Upsetters.

Professional retrospective reviews
Review scores
Source	Rating
AllMusic	4/5 stars
Encyclopedia of Popular Music	4/5 stars
The Great Rock Discography	6/10
Pitchfork	8.9/10
The Rolling Stone Album Guide	3/5 stars
Spin Alternative Record Guide	10/10
Tom Hull	B
The Village Voice	B−

In a retrospective review, musician Dominique Leone reviewed Soon Over Babaluma for Pitchfork, singling out "Chain Reaction/Quantum Physics" duo as the record's highlight and writing that he "was constantly surprised at how clear everything sounded, as if the band had recorded all of this stuff in one fell swoop during an unbelievably inspired, marathon session. One of the great things about Can ... was the attention to detail and realization that the effect of each tiny moment in the course of a song can affect the momentum of the entire piece. No small miracles here: even if it's sad to think these albums represent Can's last great gasp, none of their moments have ever sounded better". However, Leone felt mixed about "Splash" saying it was underwhelming, "seeming tired and directionless in comparison to the rest of the record".

In his review for Allmusic, music journalist Ned Raggett stated that "with Suzuki departed, vocal responsibilities were now split between Karoli and Schmidt. Wisely, neither try to clone Mooney or Suzuki, instead aiming for their own low-key way around things", giving the album a rating of four stars out of five. The Spin Alternative Record Guide considers Soon Over Babaluma to be the best album among Can discography, highlighting the side two sequence of "Chain Reaction/Quantum Physics" as Can's "absolute zenith" and lauding the performance synergy of Czukay and Liebezeit. In The Rolling Stone Album Guide, Douglas Wolk said the album was "mellow and almost timid in places", with the exception of "Chain Reaction", deeming the song a precursor to 1990s techno.

Robert Christgau was less impressed in The Village Voice, comparing its "singularly European" music to a less interesting, less biting variation on Miles Davis' 1970s electric period: "It's never pompous, discernibly smart, playful, even goofy. If you give it your all you can make out a few shards of internal logic. But the light tone avoids texture, density, or pain. The jazzy pulse is innocent of swing, funk, or sex".

== Legacy ==
In conversation with Irmin Schmidt, The Fall's Mark E. Smith told him that Can "saved his life and he even bought Soon Over Babaluma". In the same conversation, Schmidt said that he still liked the album, calling it "one of the last of the good Can records".

In 2024, the Rolling Stone ranked 74 best albums of 1974, placing Soon Over Babaluma at number 47.

In 2023, Bigwax record store (based in Paris, France) changed its name to "Babaluma", explaining that Can's diverse sound fusions of rock, electronic music, and ambient, represented the store's record stock.

== Track listing ==
All music is composed by Holger Czukay, Michael Karoli, Jaki Liebezeit, and Irmin Schmidt.

Side A
No.	Title	Lyrics	Length
1.	"Dizzy Dizzy"	Duncan Fallowell	5:40
2.	"Come sta, La Luna"	Schmidt	5:42
3.	"Splash"	instrumental	7:45

Side B
No.	Title	Lyrics	Length
4.	"Chain Reaction"	Can	11:09
5.	"Quantum Physics"	instrumental	8:31

== Personnel ==
Can

- Michael Karoli – vocals (1, 4, 5), violin (1), guitar (all tracks), electric violin (2, 3), backing vocals (2)
- Irmin Schmidt – organ (all tracks), electric piano (1, 3, 4, 5), Alpha 77 (all tracks), piano (1, 3, 4, 5), electronic percussion, (2) vocals (2)
- Jaki Liebezeit – percussion (all tracks)
- Holger Czukay – bass (all tracks)

Production

- Can – producers
- Holger Czukay – chief engineer and editing
- Ulli Eichberger – artwork and design
- Andreas Torkler – 2005 remastering

== Release history ==
The album was first released in LP format throughout Europe in 1974 via United Artists Records, with the exclusion of Spain where it was released on Ariola Eurodisc. It was published in the U.S. the following year through United Artists. In 1989, it was first released in CD format in Europe and the U.S. on Spoon Records and Mute Records. In 2005, the album was remastered and first published in Super Audio CD format.

See the table below for a more comprehensive list of the album releases.

Year	Format	Label	Country	Note
1974	LP	United Artists (UA[S|G] 29673[1])	France, Germany, UK, Yugoslavia	—
1974	LP	Ariola Eurodisc (88723-I)	Spain	—
1975	LP	United Artists (UA-LA343-G)	U.S.	—
1981	LP	Celluloid (CEL 6610)	France	—
1984	LP	Spoon (SPOON 010)	Germany	—
1989	CD	Spoon (SPOON 010)	Germany, Austria	—
1998	CD	Mute (9065–2) / Spoon (SPOON CD[0]10)	U.S.	—
2005	CD	P-Vine (PCD-22206)	Japan	—
2005	SACD	Spoon (SPOON SA 010)/(0724356329621) / Mute (9289–2)	Europe, UK, U.S.	Remastered
2007	CD	Spoon ([CD ] SPOON[CD] [0]10[ WY])	Germany	—
2007	CD	ArsNova (AN99-0320)	Russia	—
