= Mother Sky =

Song by Can

from the album Soundtracks
- Released: September 1970
- Recorded: July 1970
- Genre: Progressive rock; Krautrock
- Length: 14:31
- Label: Liberty Records
- Songwriter: Can
- Producer: Can

"Mother Sky" is a song by the krautrock group Can, written by members Holger Czukay, Jaki Liebezeit, Michael Karoli, Irmin Schmidt, and Damo Suzuki. Lasting fourteen and a half minutes, it was recorded in July 1970 for the soundtrack of Jerzy Skolimowski's film Deep End and released in 1970 on Can's Soundtracks album. It opens in mid guitar solo before settling down into a familiar Can groove as singer Damo Suzuki mulls the relative merits of madness and "Mother Sky".

"Mother Sky" was covered by the UK band Loop for their Black Sun 12" in 1988. Th' Faith Healers included a version on their debut album Lido in 1992.
