= The Lost Tapes (Can album) =

Compilation album by Can
- Released: 18 June 2012
- Recorded: 1968–1977
- Genre: Krautrock; experimental rock; psychedelic rock
- Length: 195:55
- Label: Spoon Records
- Producer: Can

Can chronology
| Sacrilege (1997) | The Lost Tapes (2012) | The Singles (2017) |

Professional ratings
Aggregate scores
| Source | Rating |
|---|---|
| Metacritic | 85/100 |
Review scores
| Source | Rating |
| AllMusic | 4/5 stars |
| Blurt | 9/10 |
| Clash | 7/10 |
| Filter | 90% |
| God is in the TV | 5/5 |
| The Independent | 5/5 stars |
| NME | 8/10 |
| Pitchfork | 7.1/10 |
| Uncut | 4.5/5 stars |
| Tom Hull | A− |

The Lost Tapes is a compilation album of studio outtakes and live recordings by the German experimental rock band Can, which was originally released as an LP in 2012 by Spoon Records in conjunction with Mute Records. The compilation was curated by Irmin Schmidt and Daniel Miller, compiled by Irmin Schmidt and Jono Podmore, and edited by Jono Podmore.

== Relocation of studio and finding of material ==
When the Can studio in Weilerswist was sold to the German Rock N Pop Museum, they bought everything, including the army mattresses that covered the walls for sound protection, and relocated it to Gronau. While dismantling the studio, master tapes were found and stored in the Spoon archive. With barely legible labeling, no one was sure what was on these until Irmin Schmidt and long time collaborator Jono Podmore started to go through over 30 hours of music. They found years of archived material, not outtakes, but rather tracks which had been shelved for a variety of reasons – soundtracks to films that were never released and tracks that didn't make it onto the final versions of albums due to space. Irmin Schmidt explains "Obviously the tapes weren't really lost, but were left in the cupboards of the studio archives for so long everybody just forgot about them. Everybody except Hildegard [Schmidt, Irmin's wife], who watches over Can and its work like the dragon over the gold of the Nibelungen and doesn't allow forgetting."

== Final cut and reception ==
The final cut of tracks, dating from 1968 to 1977, features studio material recorded at Schloss Nörvenich and Can Studio, Weilerswist with the Can line-up of Holger Czukay on bass, Michael Karoli on guitars, Jaki Liebezeit on drums and Irmin Schmidt on keyboards, and on most tracks, vocals from Malcolm Mooney or Damo Suzuki.

Alongside its critical acclaim, the album was also very successful in UK based independent record shops, in which it entered the Official Record Store Chart at No.1.

== Track listing ==
CD One
| No. | Title | Writer(s) | Recorded | Length |
|---|---|---|---|---|
| 1. | "Millionenspiel" | Holger Czukay, Michael Karoli, Jaki Liebezeit, Irmin Schmidt | 1968 | 5:49 |
| 2. | "Waiting for the Streetcar" | Czukay, Karoli, Liebezeit, Schmidt, Malcolm Mooney | 1968/1969 | 10:08 |
| 3. | "Evening All Day" | Czukay, Karoli, Liebezeit, Schmidt | 1972 | 6:58 |
| 4. | "Deadly Doris" | Czukay, Karoli, Liebezeit, Schmidt, Mooney | 1968 | 3:10 |
| 5. | "Graublau" | Czukay, Karoli, Liebezeit, Schmidt | 1969 | 16:47 |
| 6. | "When Darkness Comes" | Czukay, Karoli, Liebezeit, Schmidt, Mooney | 1969 | 3:48 |
| 7. | "Blind Mirror Surf" | Czukay, Karoli, Liebezeit, Schmidt, David Johnson | 1968 | 8:39 |
| 8. | "Oscura Primavera" | Czukay, Karoli, Liebezeit, Schmidt, Johnson | 1968 | 3:19 |
| 9. | "Bubble Rap" | Czukay, Karoli, Liebezeit, Schmidt, Damo Suzuki | 1972 | 9:24 |

CD Two
| No. | Title | Writer(s) | Recorded | Length |
|---|---|---|---|---|
| 1. | "Your Friendly Neighbourhood Whore" | Czukay, Karoli, Liebezeit, Schmidt, Mooney | 1969 | 3:43 |
| 2. | "True Story" | Czukay, Karoli, Liebezeit, Schmidt, Mooney | 1968 | 4:30 |
| 3. | "The Agreement" | Czukay, Karoli, Liebezeit, Schmidt, Mooney | 1971 | 0:37 |
| 4. | "Midnight Sky" | Czukay, Karoli, Liebezeit, Schmidt, Mooney | 1968 | 2:44 |
| 5. | "Desert" | Czukay, Karoli, Liebezeit, Schmidt, Mooney | 1969 | 3:20 |
| 6. | "Spoon (Live)" | Czukay, Karoli, Liebezeit, Schmidt, Suzuki | 1972 | 16:47 |
| 7. | "Dead Pigeon Suite" | Czukay, Karoli, Liebezeit, Schmidt, Suzuki | 1972 | 11:47 |
| 8. | "Abra Cada Braxas" | Czukay, Karoli, Liebezeit, Schmidt, Suzuki | 1973 | 10:12 |
| 9. | "A Swan Is Born" | Czukay, Karoli, Liebezeit, Schmidt, Suzuki | 1972 | 3:00 |
| 10. | "The Loop" | Czukay, Karoli, Liebezeit, Schmidt | 1974 | 2:33 |

CD Three
| No. | Title | Writer(s) | Recorded | Length |
|---|---|---|---|---|
| 1. | "Godzilla Fragment" | Czukay, Karoli, Liebezeit, Schmidt | 1975 | 1:59 |
| 2. | "On the Way to Mother Sky" | Czukay, Karoli, Liebezeit, Schmidt | 1970 | 4:35 |
| 3. | "Midnight Men" | Czukay, Karoli, Liebezeit, Schmidt | 1975 | 7:35 |
| 4. | "Networks of Foam" | Czukay, Karoli, Liebezeit, Schmidt | 1975 | 12:36 |
| 5. | "Messer, Scissors, Fork and Light" | Czukay, Karoli, Liebezeit, Schmidt, Suzuki | 1972 | 8:24 |
| 6. | "Barnacles" | Czukay, Karoli, Liebezeit, Schmidt, Rosko Gee | 1977 | 7:46 |
| 7. | "E.F.S. 108" | Czukay, Karoli, Liebezeit, Schmidt | 1976 | 2:07 |
| 8. | "Private Nocturnal" | Czukay, Karoli, Liebezeit, Schmidt | 1975 | 6:49 |
| 9. | "Alice" | Czukay, Karoli, Liebezeit, Schmidt | 1974 | 1:56 |
| 10. | "Mushroom (Live)" | Czukay, Karoli, Liebezeit, Schmidt, Suzuki | 1972 | 8:18 |
| 11. | "One More Saturday Night (Live)" | Czukay, Karoli, Liebezeit, Schmidt, Suzuki | 1973 | 6:34 |

== Personnel ==
- Holger Czukay – bass, engineering, editing
- Michael Karoli – guitar
- Jaki Liebezeit – drums
- Irmin Schmidt – keyboards
- Malcolm Mooney – vocals
- Damo Suzuki – vocals
- David Johnson – flute on "Millionenspiel", "Blind Mirror Surf" and "Oscura Primavera"
- Rosco Gee – bass on "Barnacles"
- Gerd Dudek – saxophone on "Millionenspiel"
- Jono Podmore — editing
