= Can Live Music (Live 1971–1977) =

Live album by Can
- Released: 1999
- Recorded: 1972–1977
- Genre: Krautrock
- Length: 122:53
- Label: Spoon
- Producer: Can

Can Live Music (Live 1971–1977) is a double live album by the band Can, released in 1999 and recorded in the UK and West Germany between 1972 and 1977 (despite the title referencing 1971). It was originally included in the Can box set titled Can Box.

The album contains several free improvisations ("Jynx", "Fizz", "Colchester Finale" and "Kata Kong") that were titled for this release, and are not songs from any of Can's studio albums. The extended version of "Spoon" is from the same show appearing in the film Can Free Concert 1972 by Peter Przygodda, which was also included as part of Can Box.

In 2021, Mute Records released Live in Brighton 1975, which includes full versions of the tracks titled "Dizzy Dizzy" and "Vernal Equinox" on Can Live Music. Because these tracks are actually improvisations on the themes of those songs, they are titled numerically (as "Drei" and "Vier" respectively) as with the other tracks on Live in Brighton 1975.

== Reception ==
Professional ratings
Review scores
Source	Rating
AllMusic	4.5/5 stars
Pitchfork	9.5/10
The Rolling Stone Album Guide	2.5/5 stars

== Track listing ==
All songs written by Holger Czukay, Michael Karoli, Jaki Liebezeit and Irmin Schmidt, except where noted.

=== Disc one ===
1. "Jynx" – 16:06
  14 October 1975, Universität, Giessen
2. "Dizzy Dizzy" – 8:02
  19 November 1975, Sussex University, Brighton
3. "Vernal Equinox" – 12:44
  19 November 1975, Sussex University, Brighton
4. "Fizz" (Czukay, Karoli, Liebezeit, Schmidt, Rosko Gee) – 6:27
  2 March 1977, University of Keele, Keele
5. "Yoo Doo Right" (Czukay, Karoli, Liebezeit, Schmidt, Malcolm Mooney) – 14:26
  4 May 1975, Greyhound, Croydon
6. "Cascade Waltz" – 4:48
  23 March 1977, Sound Circus, London

=== Disc two ===
1. "Colchester Finale" including "Halleluhwah" (Czukay, Karoli, Liebezeit, Schmidt, Damo Suzuki) – 37:24
  8 May 1972, University of Essex, Colchester
2. "Kata Kong" – 8:28
  21 November 1975, Hatfield Polytechnic, Hatfield
3. "Spoon" (Czukay, Karoli, Liebezeit, Schmidt, Suzuki) – 14:23
  3 February 1972, Sporthalle, Cologne

== Personnel ==
Can

- Holger Czukay – bass (1972–1975); short wave radio, sampler & electronic treatments (1977)
- Michael Karoli – guitar, vocals
- Jaki Liebezeit – drums, percussion
- Irmin Schmidt – keyboards
- Damo Suzuki – vocals (1972 only)
- Rosko Gee – bass (1977 only)

=== Production ===
- Andy Hall – made and/or collected concert recordings
- Michael Karoli and Irmin Schmidt – complied
- Michael Karoli and Jono Podmore – soundprocessing and mastering
