= Future Days (album) =

1973 studio album by Can

Studio album by Can
- Released: 1 August 1973
- Recorded: July–September 1973
- Studios: Inner Space Studio (Weilerswist, West Germany)
- Genres: Krautrock; space rock; ambient; electronic; progressive rock
- Length: 41:04
- Label: United Artists
- Producer: Can

Can chronology
Ege Bamyası (1972)	Future Days (1973)	Soon Over Babaluma (1974)

Singles from Future Days
- 1. "Moonshake/Future Days" Released: 1973

Future Days is the fourth studio album by the German Krautrock group Can, released by United Artists in 1 August 1973. The album employed significantly more complex production than any other album in the Can discography, and explored a more ambient–influenced sound. It was the group's final album to feature vocalist Damo Suzuki, who left the band within a few months after its release.

According to Can biographer Rob Young, Future Days distinguishes itself as the group's "most weightless achievement, perpetuum mobile, solar-powered in an eternal peach sunset, skipping over the tips of green coastal sierras, gulping lungfuls of delicious air."

== Background and production ==
In the aftermath of the Ege Bamyası tour spanning February—May 1973, Can drew their attention back towards the recording studio to capitalise on the recent live appearances. Before they started working on a new album, the band took a four-week vacation, which put them into a "sunny" mood that left an impression on the core sonic themes of Future Days. Holger Czukay took a trip to southeast Asia, his admired region since he sampled traditional Vietnamese music for his Canaxis 5 project. Damo Suzuki traveled back to his native Japan for the first time in six years, and returned with his hair cropped to just below the ears. He recalled feeling that his home country was very busy, and preferred to stay in the slower-paced West Germany. Irmin Schmidt took his family to the south of France, and Michael Karoli visited his family's summer villa at Carvoeiro on the Portuguese coast.

Future Days was recorded at the band's Inner Space Studio in Weilerswist, North Rhine-Westphalia. The recording process started in July and ended in early September, and was their most complex production to date. "Bel Air" was the first song recorded, captured on tape during one session. While they were recording the track, the studio's heating system sprung a gas leak. As noted on the original LP sleeve, "Bel Air" is dedicated to Hedy Lamarr, the Vienna-born Hollywood actress and the co-creator (with American composer George Antheil) of a frequency-hopping system for the United States Navy's torpedoes; Schmidt greatly admired her story.

== Composition ==
Future Days emphasises the ambient elements explored by Can on previous albums, dispensing with traditional rock song structures and instead "creating hazy, expansive soundscapes dominated by percolating rhythms and evocative layers of keys". In a retrospective review, PopMatters described the album as "driven by a coastal breeze, exuding a more pleasant, relaxed mood than anything the band had previously recorded."

Schmidt took into account the elite music scene some of the band members previously inhabited, which centered around the notion that it "had bought the whole spirit and culture for itself". Schmidt wanted to create music "related to [the] body", a quality which he felt was "lacking in the music he was making before". Young felt that the resulting music featured the band as a unified and harmonious whole. He felt that it displayed elements of psychedelic rock and space rock, but in a less "performative and theatrical" tone.

=== Songs ===
The opening track "Future Days" begins with a minute of abstract electroacoustic music, which builds into a Latin-tinged groove that languidly cruises through a "turbulent, undulating course". Karoli imagined the song as portraying a science fiction narrative with a Jules Verne-esque nineteenth-century spaceship. It has notes of melancholy and the disillusionment heard on "Doko E" from Unlimited Edition, which expresses Suzuki's negative feelings from his recent visit to Japan. The song manifests a picture of a "daily existence that feels empty of meaning, a life postponed". The shimmering, scouring texture, reminiscent of buzzing cicadas, was created by "overloading the organ through the Farfisa [organ]'s rotating speaker, processed with the Alpha 77 [Schmidt's custom effects unit], with extra gating in the mix." Another sound was created as a looped recording of a crunching cushion from Can's studio. Czukay integrated an editing trick for the song's coda, looping a segment of the rhythm track at double speed.

"Spray", while masterfully performed, does not sound "showy or professionalised" according to band biographer Rob Young, with Liebezeit drumming with "minimal loss of energy" in perpetual motion, "relentlessly ricochet[ing] off the pulse in seething drifts". It has been compared to Miles Davis' Bitches Brew and Isaac Hayes' Hot Buttered Soul. "Moonshake" has been identified by Young among the "Can catalogue of perfectly formed pop songs", alongside "She Brings the Rain" from Soundtracks and "Sing Swan Song" from Ege Bamyası. It introduces "elements of rock convention" while "erasing any sense of cliché around them".

Karoli, when working on "Bel Air", was inspired by his recent oceanside vacation. He added an echo effect to his guitar to evoke a cliff's outlines, overlapped with a progression of strong and softer chords. Schmidt, in turn, "got the exact sound of the wind which was blowing in the house where Karoli was staying". Schmidt recalled of the track's opening section: "Everybody played very soft and we had headphones on, whoever was at the mixer didn't want to bring the sound up because we would have heard that and it would have disturbed the atmosphere so he didn't dare to move the controls. Thus it got a lot of tape noise". While recording the track, Schmidt had to "listen, and never interfere" with the other musicians, acting as "just one big ear, looking stunned to my fingers". Can integrated a field recording of a bird in a meadow into the song, which "took pains" for Schmidt to locate in the WDR's sound library.

== Release ==
Future Days was released in 1 August 1973 by United Artists Records and supported by the double A-side single "Moonshake/Future Days". While Future Days was still in post-production, Can performed at the Edinburgh International Festival on 25 August, and recorded the show with the intention of releasing a live album; however, crucial elements of the band's sound, such as Michael's guitar and Damo's voice, were not recorded, and so the tapes were discarded. Before Damo's departure later in 1973, he performed with the band on eight live dates in Germany between 1 and 14 October, including three double bills with Amon Düül II.

Future Days, along with the rest of the Can discography, was remastered from the original tapes and released by the joint efforts of Spoon Records and Mute Records, in both vinyl and CD formats.

=== Artwork ===
The album cover features a midnight blue background contrasted against the serif version of the Greek letter Psi placed in the middle, above the title, and the Chinese I Ching hexagram dǐng, underlining the title. The surrounding graphics are based on the Art Nouveau style. The Psi is shaped like a trident, reflecting the fluid atmosphere of the album; while the upper trigram stands for fire and the lower means gentleness, wind, and wood. Schmidt added the hexagrams, feeling they suited the band's most "summery and tender record".

== Critical reception ==
=== Contemporary ===
Ian MacDonald of NME praised Future Days, calling it "an immaculate piece of work full of distance and air", balancing between abstract and concrete; [...] the best German rock record so far, apart from Faust". He especially praised "Bel Air", saying that "the standard of creative interplay" during the last minutes was "close to supernatural". NME subsequently ranked it the 11th best album of 1974. French music critic Jacques LeBlanc was impressed by the musicians' ability to submerge themselves into one entity and "express the soul of the group [...], a penetrating, hovering sound which ransacks and annihilates you". Paul Alessandrini, writing for Rock & Folk magazine, was captivated by the album, experiencing it as "an invitation to a voyage, a descent into a kind of musical unconscious, a slow, planetary, cosmic vibration, a psychedelic trip [...] It's not so much an intellectual music, more of a musical appeal to the senses". John Payne, describing the vocals, said that Damo Suzuki is "more often than not an evanescent sprite, poking his head in on select passages of each piece, as if to prod or enhance, only to dash away as the band takes off on their rigorous roamings into the unknown."

Ray Fox-Cumming of Disc gave the album a negative review, stating that "even after half a dozen hearings I still found most of it went in one ear and straight out the other."

BBC radio DJ John Peel, reviewing the single "Moonshake" for Sounds, described it as "less than promising" but still "great", although he considered its chances to become a hit "roughly comparable to his chances of being asked to join Ivy Benson's All-Girl Orchestra on harp".

=== Retrospective ===
Retrospective professional reviews
Review scores
Source	Rating
AllMusic	5/5 stars
The Encyclopedia of Popular Music	5/5 stars
The Great Rock Discography	7/10
Pitchfork	8.8/10
Spin Alternative Record Guide	9/10
The Rolling Stone Album Guide	3.5/5 stars

In a retrospective review, AllMusic's Anthony Tognazzini called Future Days "fiercely progressive, calming, complex, intense, and beautiful all at once" and one of the band's most fully actualized and lasting achievements. He particularly liked Suzuki's vocals for minimalistic texture and shading, and praised "Bel Air" as "a gloriously expansive piece of music". The Pitchfork review by Dominique Leone admired the "lush veneer" of the album, which created "the greatest tropicália known to man", and considered the band's performance their most "sensuous or divorced from gravity".

Suzuki later called it the best album he made with Can: "It was very easy to quit from Can after that album. I wanted nothing from them after that. Musically, I was very satisfied." Liebezeit, on the other hand, felt the album was too fragmented, loathing the idea of constructing a track "artificially from the best fragments of tape", while he leaned more towards the "very simple things" from the early Can and preferred to "hone down one monotonous rhythm pattern". He further explained that he felt "there was too much the feeling of stitched-together movements, of long-form pieces moving through different variations and atmospheres" on the album.

=== Accolades ===
Publications/sources	Accolades	Year	Rank
Uncut	"200 Greatest Albums of All Time"	2016	121
Rolling Stone	"50 Greatest Prog Rock Albums of All Time"	2015	8
Tom Moon	"1,000 Recordings to Hear Before You Die"	2008	-
GQ	"The 100 Coolest Albums in the World Right Now!"	2005	70
Pitchfork	"Top 100 Albums of the 1970s"	2004	56
Stylus	"Top 101-200 Albums of All Time"	2004	160
Mojo	"The 100 Greatest Albums Ever Made"	1995	62

== Track listing ==
All tracks are written by Can (Holger Czukay, Michael Karoli, Jaki Liebezeit, Irmin Schmidt and Damo Suzuki).

Side A
No.	Title	Length
1.	"Future Days"	9:34
2.	"Spray"	8:28
3.	"Moonshake"	3:02

Side B
No.	Title	Length
4.	"Bel Air" ( (Note: "Bel Air" is listed as "Spare a Light" on the vinyl label of the original United Artists UK pressing (UAS 29505). However, the LP sleeve of the same pressing marks it as "Bel Air".))	20:00
Total length:		41:04

== Personnel ==
Credits adapted from Future Days vinyl liner notes.

Can

- Holger Czukay – bass guitar, double bass, recording, editing
- Michael Karoli – electric guitar, violin
- Jaki Liebezeit – drums, percussion, congas (1), "melodica-type instrument" (3)
- Irmin Schmidt – Farfisa organ, electric piano, electronics
- Damo Suzuki – vocals, percussion

Production

- Ingo Trauer and Richard J. Rudow – cover-art design
- Chris Sladdin and Volker Liedtke – recording
