= Duncan Fallowell =

English novelist, travel writer and critic (born 1948)

Duncan Fallowell FRSL
- Born: 26 September 1948 (age 78); London, England
- Education: St Paul's School, London; Magdalen College, Oxford
- Occupations: Novelist, travel writer, journalist and critic
- Awards: PEN/Ackerley Prize, 2012; John Heygate Award, 2014
- Website: www.duncanfallowell.com

Duncan Fallowell FRSL (born 26 September 1948) is an English novelist, travel writer, memoirist, journalist and critic.

== Early life ==
Fallowell was born on 26 September 1948 in London, son of Thomas Edgar Fallowell, of Finchampstead, near Wokingham, Berkshire, and La Croix-Valmer, France, and Celia, née Waller. His father, marketing director for a wire manufacturing company, founded the family business Arrow Wire Products in 1965. He had been an officer in the RAF during World War II. The family moved to Somerset and Essex, before settling in Berkshire. While at St Paul's School, London, Fallowell established a friendship with John Betjeman, and through him, links to literary London. In 1967, he went to Magdalen College, Oxford (BA and MA in Modern History). At the university, he was a pupil of Karl Leyser, Hugh Trevor-Roper, and Howard Colvin. He was also part of a group experimenting with psychedelic drugs. While an undergraduate he became a friend of April Ashley, whose biography he later wrote.

== Career ==
In 1970, at the age of 21, Fallowell was given a pop column in The Spectator. He was subsequently the magazine's film critic and fiction critic. During the 1970s, he travelled in Europe, India and the Far East, collaborated on the punk glossies Deluxe and Boulevard; was a reviewer for the monthlies Books and Bookmen and Records and Recording; and worked with the avant-garde German group Can. He began writing about Can's music in the British press in 1970 and visited the group in Cologne soon after. Early in the same decade he explored other aspects of the German rock scene, visiting Berlin, Munich and Hamburg. He wrote verbal covers to many of Can singer Damo Suzuki's non-linguistic vocals. When Damo left the band in 1973, Fallowell was asked if he would like to take over as a vocalist. Fallowell noted that "after a long dark night of the soul", he decided against it.

In 1979, he edited a collection of short stories, Drug Tales. This was followed by two novels, Satyrday and The Underbelly. Chris Petit, reviewing the second for The Times, wrote: "The author's pose and prose is that of dandy as cosh-boy.... The writing attains a sort of frenzied detachment found in the drawings of Steadman or Scarfe."

During the 1980s, Fallowell spent much of his time in the south of France and in Sicily, celebrated in the travel book To Noto (1989). Patrick Taylor-Martin, reviewing it, called the author "stylishly at ease with the louche, the camp, the intellectual, the vaguely criminal. His prose combines baroque extravagance with a shiny demotic smartness.... He is particularly good on the sexual atmosphere." His second travel book: One Hot Summer in St Petersburg, was the outcome of a period living in Russia's old imperial capital. Michael Ratcliffe, literary editor of The Observer, made it his Book of the Year: it "combines, as exhilaratingly as Christopher Isherwood's Berlin writings, the pleasures of travel, reporting, autobiography.... There is candour of every kind... an absolute knockout." Anthony Cross, Emeritus Professor of Slavonic Studies at the University of Cambridge, in his book St Petersburg and the British, wrote that Fallowell's "evocation of life in the new St Petersburg is a stunning tour de force... in the spirit of Nikolai Gogol."

It was while living in St Petersburg that he wrote the first draft of the libretto for the opera Gormenghast, inspired by Mervyn Peake’s trilogy. With music composed by Irmin Schmidt, this was first staged in 1998 at the Wuppertal Opera in Germany, which had commissioned it. Schmidt was a member of Can and Fallowell had already written the lyrics to two albums of his songs: Musk at Dusk (1987) and Impossible Holidays (1991). This work is also featured in Irmin Schmidt's compilation Villa Wunderbar (2013) and his collection Electro Violet (2015).

A third novel, A History of Facelifting (2003), draws on his experience of the Marches, the border country in Herefordshire and mid-Wales, which Fallowell discovered in 1972 when he first visited Hay-on-Wye at the invitation of Richard Booth, the self-styled 'King of Hay'. Fallowell has visited the area often since then, at times staying for long periods in remote cottages. A third travel book, Going As Far As I Can, recounted Fallowell's wanderings through New Zealand. Jonathan Meades described it as having the ghostly atmosphere of de Chirico's paintings: "The text has the movement of a dream," he remarked in the New Statesman feature "Books of the Year 2008".

His books have been controversial – Bruno Bayley in Vice wrote that Fallowell has "penned novels that people seem to have a tendency to burn." In the same interview, Fallowell told him: "Fiction is such a turn-off word, not because I am against imaginative work – of course not – but because there is so much crap published as fiction. I am interested in literature. I am not interested in some commercial idea that is simply verbalised. I want high performance language operated by an expert." Roger Lewis dubbed Fallowell "the modern Petronius" in a recent book.

As a journalist, Fallowell identified with the New Journalism movement, which advanced a literary form variously taking in reportage, interview, commentary, autobiography, travel, history and criticism. He has only worked freelance. His writings have appeared in The Times, The Sunday Times, Observer, Guardian, Independent, The Daily Telegraph, The American Scholar, the Paris Review, Tatler, Vanity Fair, Marie Claire, Playboy, Penthouse, Encounter, Tages Anzeiger, The Age, La Repubblica, New Statesman, Vice, and many other publications. He has often contributed to the intellectual monthly Prospect and has had columns in The Spectator, the Evening Standard and several online magazines. A collection of Fallowell's interview-profiles, Twentieth Century Characters was described by Richard Davenport-Hines as "like Aubrey's Brief Lives in twentieth-century accents. The effect is of a rich, energetic frivolity and passionate curiosity about human types."

April Ashley's Odyssey, Fallowell's authorised biography of his friend, was published in 1982. In 2006, April Ashley published what purported to be a new book, her autobiography; but this was discovered to be mostly a reprint of the Fallowell book. After taking legal action for plagiarism, Fallowell received damages, costs, and the reaffirmation of his intellectual property rights; and a public apology from the authors and John Blake Publishing was printed in The Bookseller on 1 December 2006.

The memoir How To Disappear: A Memoir For Misfits was published in 2011 by Ditto Press, designed by Nazareno Crea; it was awarded the PEN/Ackerley Prize for memoir in 2012. Chairman of the judges Peter Parker commended it as "a subtle, beautifully written and often very funny example of autobiography by stealth." Alan Hollinghurst, in the Guardian Books of the Year, called it 'brilliant and haunting'. The Independent on Sunday said Fallowell "writes like a spikier Sebald, alternating between acerbic witticisms and passages of voluptuous description."

He published his fourth novel London Paris New York in 2020 in electronic form via Amazon.

Fallowell has for many years conducted an epistolary relationship with the Surrealist Mexican artist Pedro Friedeberg.

In an interview with Prospect magazine (May 2008), Fallowell said: ". . . both Graham Greene and Harold Acton said that I belong to the 21st century. At the time I was rather distressed by that, as it seemed a form of rejection. But now I understand it a little better."

== Awards ==
- PEN/Ackerley Prize for memoir, 2012
- John Heygate Award, 2014.
- Fellow of the Royal Society of Literature, 2015.

== See also ==
- List of avant-garde artists
- Psychedelic literature
- Soon Over Babaluma, an album by Can on which Fallowell wrote the lyrics to the opening track
