= Music of The Get Down =

The music featured in the American musical drama television series The Get Down consists of a soundtrack by various artists and an original score composed by Elliott Wheeler.

== Official soundtrack ==
The official soundtrack of The Get Down includes original songs from the series, cover versions and several songs from the 1960s and 1970s, with a principal focus on disco, R&B, funk, and soul. Likewise the TV series, it was released in two parts.

=== The Get Down ===
The Get Down (Original Soundtrack from the Netflix Original Series) is the official soundtrack for the first part of The Get Down featuring various artists, released by RCA Records on August 12, 2016.

=== The Get Down: Part II ===
The Get Down: Part II (Original Soundtrack from the Netflix Original Series) is the official soundtrack for the second part of The Get Down featuring various artists, released by RCA Records on April 21, 2017.

== Official score ==
The Get Down (Score Soundtrack from the Netflix Original Series) is the official score for both the first and the second part of The Get Down featuring original orchestral music and vocal performances, released by RCA Records on September 8, 2017. The score of the series was composed by Elliott Wheeler.

== Featured music ==
This is a list of non−original songs that are featured in the series but not in the official soundtrack.

=== Episode 1: "Where There Is Ruin, There Is Hope for a Treasure" ===
- The Spinners – The Rubberband Man
- Earth, Wind & Fire – Shining Star
- Can − Vitamin C (2004 Remastered)
- Little Beaver – Concrete Jungle
- Salsoul Orchestra – Magic Bird of Fire
- The Trammps – Disco Inferno
- Wild Cherry – Play That Funky Music
- Earth, Wind & Fire – Be Ever Wonderful
- Boney M. – Daddy Cool
- Murray Head – Superstar
- Fatback Band – (Are You Ready) Do the Bus Stop
- C.J. & Co. – Devil’s Gun
- The New Swing Sextet – Revolucionando
- Incredible Bongo Band – Apache (Grandmaster Flash Remix)
- Eastside Connection – Frisco Disco
- Rhythm Heritage – Theme song from the TV show S.W.A.T.
- Billy Squier – The Big Beat
- Michael Kiwanuka – Rule the World
- Vicki Sue Robinson – Turn the Beat Around

=== Episode 2: "Seek Those Who Fan Your Flames" ===
- La Lupe – El Carbonero
- Hot Chocolate – Heaven Is the Back Seat of My Cadillac
- Henry Mancini – The Pink Panther Theme
- Willie Colon – El Malo
- Lyn Collins – Think (About It)
- Marvin Gaye – Mercy Mercy Me (The Ecology)
- Nina Simone – Don’t Explain
- Commodores – The Assembly Line
- Gloria Gaynor – Never Can Say Goodbye
- Curtis Mayfield – Superfly
- Orquesta Harlow, Larry Harlow, Junior Gonzalez – La Cartera
- The Jimmy Castor Bunch – It’s Just Begun
- Aretha Franklin – Rock Steady
- Machine – There But for the Grace of God Go I

=== Episode 3: "Darkness Is Your Candle" ===
- KC and the Sunshine Band – That’s the Way (I Like It)
- George McCrae – Rock Your Baby
- The Temptations – Papa Was a Rollin' Stone
- The Rolling Stones – Hot Stuff
- Marvin Gaye – Got to Give it Up, Pt. 1
- Dynamic Corvettes – Funky Music Is The Thing (Parts 1 & 2)
- Pleasure – Let’s Dance
- Chic – Dance, Dance, Dance (Yowsah, Yowsah, Yowsah)
- Quincy Jones – Money Runner
- Joe Tex – I Gotcha
- Chocolate Milk – Action Speaks Louder Than Words
- Kool & the Gang – Hollywood Swinging
- Trio los Panchos – Besame Mucho
- The Supremes – Up the Ladder To The Roof (covered on the soundtrack)

=== Episode 4: "Forget Safety, Be Notorious" ===
- Leon Bridges – Ball of Confusion (That's What the World Is Today)
- José Feliciano – Susie Q
- Willie Colón – Juana Pena
- Tito Puente Y Su Orquesta − Cuando Calienta el Sol
- Stevie Wonder – Living for the City
- Musique – In the Bush
- Teddy Pendergrass – You Can’t Hide From Yourself (covered on the soundtrack)
- Babe Ruth – The Mexican
- The Jackson 5 – Hum Along and Dance
- CAN − Vitamin C

=== Episode 5: "You Have Wings, Learn to Fly" ===
- James Brown – Give It Up or Turnit a Loose
- Baby Huey & the Babysitters – Listen to Me
- The Jackson 5 – The Love You Save
- War – Slippin' into Darkness

=== Episode 6: "Raise Your Words, Not Your Voice" ===
- Village People – In Hollywood (Everybody is a Star)
- Marie et les Garçons − Rien à dire
- The Emotions – Best of My Love
- First Choice – Doctor Love
- Walter Murphy – A Fifth of Beethoven
- Lucy Hawkins – Gotta Get Out of Here
- John Williams & London Symphony Orchestra – Star Wars Main Title / Rebel Blockade Runner

=== Episode 7: "Unfold Your Own Myth" ===
- ABBA – Money, Money, Money (mixed with The Get Down lyrics)
- Bee Gees – Stayin' Alive
- Chuck Brown & the Soul Searchers – Bustin' Loose
- Joel Grey and Liza Minnelli – Money Money
- Dyke & the Blazers – Let a Woman Be a Woman
- Earth, Wind & Fire – September
- The Isley Brothers – Fight the Power (Part 1 & 2)
- The O'Jays – For the Love of Money
- Blondie – One Way or Another
- The Honey Drippers – Impeach the President
- John Legend feat. Chance the Rapper – Penthouse Floor
