= Yoo Doo Right =

Song by Can

from the album Monster Movie
- Released: 1969
- Genre: Krautrock
- Length: 20:27
- Label: Music Factory (first German pressing)/United Artists
- Songwriter: Can
- Producer: Can

"Yoo Doo Right" is the closing track on Can's 1969 debut album, Monster Movie, edited down from a six-hour improvisation to a twenty-minute song. "Yoo Doo Right" features a pounding, tribal drums, along with a "colossal, grinding riff, subjected to endless variation and intensification", while Malcolm Mooney chants excerpts from a love letter in a mantra-like manner.

== Legacy ==
Can continued to play the song after Mooney's departure, as heard on Can Live Music. It has been covered in abbreviated form by the Geraldine Fibbers, Thin White Rope, Masaki Batoh, Susheela Raman, Jonathan Segel, The Wendys, and others. In 2001, shortly after the death of Can guitarist Michael Karoli, a group of musicians associated with Austrian composer Karlheinz Essl performed this song in several hour-long concerts in his memory.

The song was remixed by 3p for the double remix compilation Sacrilege in 1997, reduced to a three-minute, verse-chorus-bridge pop piece.

"Movin' on Up" by Primal Scream quotes the lyric "I was blind, now I can see, you made a believer outta me" from "Yoo Doo Right".
