= The Get Down =

American musical drama television series

- Genre: Period drama; Musical
- Created by: Baz Luhrmann; Stephen Adly Guirgis
- Starring: Justice Smith; Shameik Moore; Herizen F. Guardiola; Skylan Brooks; Tremaine Brown Jr.; Yahya Abdul-Mateen II; Jimmy Smits
- Narrated by: Nas
- Country of origin: United States
- Original language: English
- No. of seasons: 1 (2 parts)
- No. of episodes: 11

Production
- Executive producers: Baz Luhrmann; Shawn Ryan; Catherine Martin; Nasir Jones; Stephen Adly Guirgis; Marney Hochman; Thomas Kelly; Paul Watters
- Production location: New York City
- Running time: 53–93 minutes
- Production companies: Bazmark Films; Sony Pictures Television
- Budget: $120 million

Original release
- Network: Netflix
- Release: August 12, 2016 – April 7, 2017

The Get Down is an American musical drama television series created by Baz Luhrmann and Stephen Adly Guirgis. The series debuted on Netflix on August 12, 2016, and was cancelled after one season.

Produced by Sony Pictures Television, the series is set in the South Bronx region of New York City in the late 1970s; its title refers to parts of disco and R&B records that could be repeated using multiple turntables and were enjoyed most by dancers. A five-episode second part concluding the series was released on April 7, 2017. On May 24, 2017, Netflix announced that the series had concluded after part two and that there would be no more seasons.

The series features heavy use of the song "Vitamin C" by the 1970s German band Can.

== Premise ==
The series is set in the 1970s in the Bronx borough of New York City and follows the rise of hip-hop and disco music through the eyes of a group of teenagers. Each episode begins with MC Books, a famous artist who raps his story to a large crowd during a concert in 1996. The short rap serves as both a recap of previous episodes and a setup of the coming events. Each episode is intercut with real footage and newscasts from the 1970s.

Part one begins in 1977 with Zeke Figuero (young MC Books), an orphaned poet who lives with his aunt Wanda following the death of his parents. He proceeds to meet Shaolin Fantastic, a graffiti artist and aspiring DJ. The two band together with Zeke's friends to become "The Get Down Brothers", with a dream to become successful music artists and take over the city. Mylene, Zeke's long-time love, dreams of becoming a disco singer and leaving the Bronx but faces obstacles such as her father, a pastor who disapproves of secular music. The show depicts various gangs and gangsters in the area, specifically Fat Annie and her son Cadillac, and observes the poverty and violence faced by those living in the Bronx in the 1970s.

Part two is set in 1978 and sees the group members entering adulthood and their futures in the music industry. Zeke is faced with an ultimatum: love or music. Although Mylene is his first love, music is his love as well. Mylene is moving up in the music industry and wants Zeke to be there with her, but doesn't think he is putting in the effort. Shaolin and the gang focus on making music and making money. Shaolin gets a car with a dead body in the trunk, which shakes the boys and makes them second-guess their relationship with him. Shaolin calms them down, explaining that everything is going to be all right. They calm down but remain worried about Cadillac and his business with Shaolin.

== Cast ==
=== Main ===
- Justice Smith as Ezekiel ("Zeke") "Books" Figuero: A smart, resourceful teen, brimming with untapped talent and unrequited love, determined to make his mark on the world. He is in love with Mylene, but her desire to leave the Bronx hinders their relationship.
- Shameik Moore as Curtis "Shaolin Fantastic", or "Shao": A child of the streets; thrill-seeking, unpredictable, and eccentric but above all, enigmatic. He is distrustful of Mylene and sees her as a distraction to Zeke.
- Herizen F. Guardiola as Mylene Cruz: A tenacious girl with an incredible voice who dreams of becoming a disco star, a dream that is far outside the realm of her fiercely religious background. She loves Zeke, but fears that he won't ever leave the Bronx.
- Skylan Brooks as Ronald "Ra-Ra" Kipling: A loyal, respected, and protective friend and brother with his head screwed on tight; he's the voice of reason beyond his years.
- Tremaine Brown Jr. as Miles "Boo-Boo" Kipling: A mechanically minded kid who is an irrepressible 40 year-old in a 14-year-old's body.
- Yahya Abdul-Mateen II as Clarence "Cadillac" Caldwell: A "fly gangster", prince of the disco world, and son of the owner of the most notorious after-hours nightspot in the Bronx.
- Jimmy Smits as Francisco "Papa Fuerte" Cruz: A South Bronx political boss who delivers services to his constituents that the city has failed to provide, such as jobs, housing, and healthcare. In Part two, it is revealed that he’s Mylene’s biological father.

=== Recurring ===
- Jaden Smith as Marcus "Dizzee" Kipling: The most artistically minded of the Kipling brothers, Dizzee is a graffiti artist who tags as Rumi 411.
- Daveed Diggs as adult Ezekiel "Mr. Books" Figuero: The rap-narrator of the series. His rapping voice is dubbed by hip-hop artist Nas.
- Giancarlo Esposito as Pastor Ramon Cruz: Papa Fuerte's brother and Mylene's father. The charismatic head of the local Pentecostal church who attracts a flock of followers with his fiery sermons and firm, steady leadership.
- Stefanée Martin as Yolanda Kipling: The sister of Boo-Boo, Dizzee, and Ra-Ra. One of Mylene's best friends and a member of the Soul Madonnas.
- Shyrley Rodriguez as Regina: Another one of Mylene's best friends and a member of the Soul Madonnas. Outrageous and rebellious, she is in an abusive relationship with Little Wolf.
- Mamoudou Athie as Grandmaster Flash: A hip-hop recording artist and DJ. In real life, he is considered to be one of the pioneers of hip-hop DJing, cutting, and mixing. In this TV series, he serves as a mentor to Shaolin Fantastic as well as the rest of the Get Down Brothers.
- Karen Aldridge as Adele Kipling: The mother of Yolanda, Boo-Boo, Dizzee, and Ra-Ra.
- Kevin Corrigan as Jackie Moreno: A record producer. In the past, Moreno produced many hit records but years of hard drug abuse and alienating others in the record industry have stalled his career.
- Brandon J. Dirden as Leon: Wanda's boyfriend.
- Michel Gill as Herbert Gunns: A New York City Council member, businessman, and supporter of then-Congressman Edward Koch.
- Zabryna Guevara as Lydia Cruz: The wife of Pastor Ramon Cruz and the mother of Mylene.
- Ron Cephas Jones as Winston Kipling: The father of Yolanda, Boo-Boo, Dizzee, and Ra-Ra.
- Judy Marte as Wanda: Ezekiel's aunt.
- Evan Parke as Wolf.
- Salma Salinas as Angela Cruz: Daughter of Pastor Ramon Cruz and Lydia Cruz and sister of Mylene.
- Sal Rendino as Stanley Kelly.
- Yolonda Ross as Ms. Green: The caring-but-tough English teacher who nurtures the potential in her students and advocates for them to pursue their talents.
- Tory Devon Smith as Little Wolf: Regina's abusive boyfriend and one of the neighborhood's drug dealers.
- Lillias White as Fat Annie: Owner of the notorious Les Inferno club, mother of Cadillac, and boss of the local crime family. She is a sexual predator and is known to be sexually abusive, specifically toward Shaolin. In part two, it is revealed by Shaolin that she sexually abused her son, Cadillac, as well.
- Frank Wood as Ed Koch: A real life U.S. Congressman from New York's 18th district and Democratic candidate for mayor of New York in 1977. Koch has a tough stance against crime (particularly graffiti) and wants to restore public safety back to New York City, so he reluctantly allies himself with Papa Fuerte to help in his campaign in the Bronx.
- Lee Tergesen as Inspector Moran: A police inspector who is on Fat Annie's payroll. He is responsible for Boo-Boo's arrest at the end of part two. He is nicknamed "Moach" by Cadillac.
- Eric Bogosian as Roy Asheton: Record executive and president of Marrakech Star, a disco label, responsible for the success of Donna Summer and Misty Holloway.
- Eric D. Hill Jr. as DJ Kool Herc: Real life DJ who is credited with originating hip-hop music in the early 1970s in the Bronx. He serves as a mentor for the Notorious Three (The Herculoids).
- Noah Le Gros as Thor: A graffiti artist who lives a free lifestyle, and Dizzee's love interest.
- Qaasim Middleton as DJ Big Planet: Member of the Notorious Three (the Herculoids), the mortal enemies of the Get Down Brothers.
- RayJonaldy Rodriguez as Silent Carlito: Another member of the Notorious Three (the Herculoids).
- Khalil Middleton as MC Luke Skywalker Cage: Another member of the Notorious Three (the Herculoids).
- Julia Garner as Claudia Gunns: Daughter of Herbert Gunns.
- Barrington Walters Jr. as Doo-Wop: Street-hardened, roughneck drug dealer.
- Jeremie Harris as Shane Vincent: Mylene Cruz's manager.
- Okieriete Onaodowan as Afrika Bambaataa: Real life hip-hop DJ and recording artist, and founder of the Universal Zulu Nation.
- Jamie Jackson as Robert Stigwood: Real-life Australian-born, British-resident music entrepreneur, film producer and impresario. Best known for managing Cream and the Bee Gees, theatrical productions like Hair and Jesus Christ Superstar, and film productions including the extremely successful Grease and Saturday Night Fever.

=== Guest ===
- Billy Porter as DJ Malibu: A DJ at Les Inferno.
- Annika Boras as Mrs. Gunns.
- Alexis Krause as Leslie Lesgold: Highly influential creator of a weekly "record pool" that selects the hottest disco records to be played by New York club DJs.
- Renée Elise Goldsberry as Misty Holloway: A popular disco singer who is idolized by Mylene.
- Bryce Pinkham as Julien.
- Imani Lewis as Tanya.

== Episodes ==
Series overview
Season	Episodes		Originally released
1	11	6	August 12, 2016
1	11	5	April 7, 2017

No. overall	No. in season	Title	Directed by	Written by	Original release date
Part 1 (1977)
1	1	"Where There Is Ruin, There Is Hope for a Treasure"	Baz Luhrmann	Story by : Baz Luhrmann & Stephen Adly Guirgis; Teleplay by : Baz Luhrmann & Stephen Adly Guirgis & Seth Zvi Rosenfeld	August 12, 2016
Set in the Bronx in 1977, Zeke is a high school student in love with his friend Mylene. She wishes to escape the Bronx and become a singer, so she and her friends attempt to impress a DJ at the Les Inferno club. Zeke obtains a rare record of Mylene's favourite song to impress her. However, Shaolin Fantastic is instructed to acquire the same record by Grandmaster Flash, another DJ who promised to mentor him if he can procure the record. Zeke gets the record but then struggles to get into the club; Mylene, already inside, attracts the attention of Cadillac who asks her to dance with him during the dance-off. Shao agrees to get Zeke into the club with the condition that Shao gets the record by the end of the night. As Zeke and Mylene dance and kiss, a gang shoot-out breaks out inside the club, killing the DJ and several others; Zeke, Mylene, and her friends barely escape. Zeke confesses his love for Mylene but she believes his reluctance to fulfil his life will stop her from leaving the Bronx. Zeke then hands over the record to Shao, who explains that he needs it for a DJing technique called "the get down". Shao, Zeke, and his friends take the record to a local club and give it to Grandmaster Flash, who uses it to create a beat with a second record. Shao and Zeke then impress the entire club with Shao's dancing and Zeke's freestyle rapping abilities. Meanwhile, Mylene has run away after being beaten by her father; she goes to stay with her uncle, Papa Fuerte. At Shao's home, Zeke and Shao discuss their future, hoping to team up and use their music to take the city by storm.
2	2	"Seek Those Who Fan Your Flames"	Ed Bianchi	Sam Bromell & Sinead Daly & Jacqui Rivera	August 12, 2016
Grandmaster Flash begins his training of Shaolin Fantastic. He begins by giving Shao a crayon that he refers to as the "key" and twenty-four hours to figure out its use. While the other boys give up and leave, Shao and Zeke stay overnight and realize the crayon is used to mark the "get down" point on the records. After further explanations, Grandmaster instructs Shao to perfect one record using his techniques. After working for a while, the boys take a break and return to discover that Shao's home has been set on fire, destroying his records and turntables. Meanwhile, Mylene's uncle Papa Fuerte arranges for a music producer to listen to her sing in church. Just before the service begins, however, Mylene's father tells her she will no longer sing solos due to her recent actions and foray into disco music. As the choir sings, the producer starts to leave, so Mylene defies her father's wishes and sings to stop him from leaving. The episode ends with Cadillac investigating who ordered the shoot-out at Les Inferno, during which he shoots a young boy from a rival gang.
3	3	"Darkness Is Your Candle"	Andrew Bernstein	T Cooper & Allison Glock-Cooper & Stephen Adly Guirgis	August 12, 2016
Set in July during a citywide blackout, Mylene's father kicks her out after her performance at the church so she stays with the Kipling family. Her uncle continues to help her reach her dreams but he is visited by Mylene's mother, Lydia, who explains that her family is breaking apart. Moreno, a producer, talks Papa Fuerte into recording a demo of Mylene to take to a big record company. Moreno and Mylene struggle to agree on a song, so he writes a new song for her. Shao, having lost all of his possessions in a fire, turns to Fat Annie to make money. She invites him into her family. This doesn't sit well with her son, Cadillac; he instructs Shao to dispose of his car. Zeke and the other boys look for jobs to help Shao raise money for new turntables. When the Kipling parents leave for a family funeral, the kids throw a party (and charge for entry), playing a mix-tape of Grandmaster's work that they purchase from a local store. Playing his music breaks the "no biting" rule, prompting the arrival of gangsters to break up the party and trash the salon. Afterward, Shao, Zeke, and the boys discover the body of a boy Cadillac shot in the trunk of his car. They dump the body in a lake and commit to taking care of each other as "the Get Down" brothers and vow to stop Cadillac's violent ways. Zeke and Mylene meet to discuss recent events, resulting in the two sleeping together.
4	4	"Forget Safety, Be Notorious"	Ed Bianchi	Aaron Rahsaan Thomas	August 12, 2016
Following the vandalism and looting that occurred during the blackout, Mayor Beame informs Papa Fuerte he can no longer provide him the $10 million needed for his restoration and housing plans. Fuerte takes back his promise to ensure Beame enough votes to win the upcoming mayoral election. Fuerte is approached by Ed Koch, another mayoral hopeful, who offers the same deal as Beame on the condition that Fuerte publicly denounces graffiti. Ms. Green, Zeke's English teacher, meets with Zeke's aunt to support his academic and creative abilities; the two decide that Zeke should take up an internship. Zeke agrees to take one with Fuerte, which also pleases Mylene. Shao and Mylene continue to disagree about the other's influence on Zeke, forcing him to choose between helping Mylene track down Moreno and fixing Shao's relationship with Grandmaster, who banned Shao from mixing after the bootlegged mix-tape incident. Zeke decides to help Shao, leading them into Herculoid territory and an ambush. After falling unconscious due to an overdose, Moreno is revived by Mylene and her friends; they take him to Fuerte, who isn't happy that he has wasted his money, meant for Mylene's demo, on drugs. Dizzee bonds with Thor, and it is revealed that Regina is in an abusive relationship with a dealer named Little Wolf.
5	5	"You Have Wings, Learn to Fly"	Michael Dinner	Seth Zvi Rosenfeld	August 12, 2016
Whilst hunting down the person responsible for the bootlegged tapes, the Get Down Brothers run into DJ Kool Herc but manage to prove it was one of his own men. He challenges the boys to a DJ battle against the Notorious Three. Grandmaster lifts Shao's ban so he can compete. Meanwhile, Pastor Cruz confronts Papa Fuerte and is shocked to see Mylene there. Fuerte reminds Cruz of his past sins before Moreno, trying to defuse the situation, explaining he wants Mylene to record a hymn with a disco twist in his church. Cruz agrees and makes peace with his daughter when he hears the final song. Zeke is late to his interview but after some hard truths from Ms. Green, he goes back and fights for the internship with Gunn. At the same time, he works with Shao and the Kipling brothers to prepare for an upcoming battle, discovering they each have different musical skills. When Mylene comes to play her record to Zeke, Shao realizes a beat in her record is the missing link for their performance and forcibly takes a copy, causing an argument between Mylene and Shao. The episode ends with the Get Down brothers finding the brother of the boy killed by Cadillac on their roof.
6	6	"Raise Your Words, Not Your Voice"	Ed Bianchi	Seth Zvi Rosenfeld & Sam Bromell	August 12, 2016
In the final episode of part one, Zeke attends an awkward dinner with Mr. Gunns. Dizzee has a new experience at a secret party in the city. As the guys gear up for an explosive DJ battle, Zeke boards a political roller-coaster. The episode ends with Mylene announcing she will be moving to Manhattan after her song became a radio hit; she makes Zeke promise he will visit her.
Part 2 (1978)
7	1	"Unfold Your Own Myth"	Lawrence Trilling	Stephen Adly Guirgis	April 7, 2017
The episode begins with Zeke writing his college admissions essay in a narrative rhyme. Tensions between Shao and the boys threaten to destabilize the group. With her star on the rise, Mylene faces new expectations for pressures. Performing on the popular show "Platinum Boogie", she tells the host that she is single for publicity's sake.
8	2	"The Beat Says, This Is the Way"	Ed Bianchi	Aaron Rahsaan Thomas	April 7, 2017
Zeke's Ivy League meeting goes off the rails, he battles which half of himself to present: his pursuit of school or music. Mylene also struggles with the expectations of stardom and being a faithful daughter. Ra-Ra has a bold proposition for Fat Annie, resulting in an explosive musical showdown at Les Inferno.
9	3	"One by One, Into the Dark"	Clark Johnson	Nelson George	April 7, 2017
Confronted by ultimatums, Zeke and Mylene each must make a tough choice. Annie pitches a deal to a sceptical Shao and a resentful Cadillac.
10	4	"Gamble Everything"	Ed Bianchi	Seth Zvi Rosenfeld	April 7, 2017
Mylene has a fateful encounter with her idol, the Cruz family reaches a critical juncture, a revelation strikes Ra-Ra, and Shao takes rash action.
11	5	"Only from Exile Can We Come Home"	Ed Bianchi	Sam Bromell & Jacqui Rivera	April 7, 2017
While the B-boy community rallies in defence of the get down, Mylene's musical fate hangs in the balance, and Zeke receives some life-altering news.

== Production ==
The series was announced in February 2015, after Luhrmann had spent over ten years developing the concept. The series is described as "a mythic saga of how New York at the brink of bankruptcy gave birth to hip-hop, punk and disco." The Sony Pictures Television show takes place in Bronx tenements, the SoHo art scene, CBGB, Studio 54 and the just-built World Trade Center. On April 9, 2015, it was announced that Justice Smith, Shameik Moore, Skylan Brooks, Jaden Smith, and newcomer Tremaine (TJ) Brown Jr. would play the show's lead male roles. On April 16, 2015, it was announced that newcomer Herizen F. Guardiola would play the show's female lead.

Rap legends Grandmaster Flash, Kurtis Blow, and Nas hosted a hip-hop boot camp to educate the young actors. The production crew used the Eisner Award-winning comic series Hip Hop Family Tree by Ed Piskor as a reference point. The Sony-produced series soon hit delays and also saw the departure of original showrunner Shawn Ryan. The first six episodes of season one debuted in August 2016, marking the first time a Netflix original season was split into two parts rather than released all at once — as has been the tradition at the streamer for scripted series. The trailer for part two was released in February 2017, with episodes being made available on Netflix on April 7, 2017. The series picked up a year later, set in 1978. The accompanying soundtrack was released on April 21, 2017. The last five episodes brought the season one episode count to 11 — two short of the original 13-episode order The Get Down received in 2015. The Get Down was Netflix's most expensive series up to date, costing around 120 million. The expense of 120 million greatly surpassed the budget of 90 million.

== Reception ==
Praise for the show primarily centred around strong music, a fresh cast, and a nod to authenticity with Luhrmann specifically involving many historical characters in producer roles, including: Nas, Grandmaster Flash, Kurtis Blow, and DJ Kool Herc. Part one holds a score of 77% on Rotten Tomatoes, based on 79 reviews, with the critic consensus reading, "The Get Down's vibrant music and energetic young cast help to elevate its meandering narrative." The season has an overall score of 69 out of 100 based on 31 reviews on Metacritic which is classified as "generally favourable reviews". Part two received an 86% rating on Rotten Tomatoes, based on 14 critics, with an average score of 7.68 out of 10, with the critic consensus reading, "The Get Down continues to be a dazzling kaleidoscope of genre styles and a warm celebration of hip-hop's origins."

The uptempo musical numbers and soundtrack were generally praised as well as the performances from the main cast and cinematography of the show. However, the overly dramatic love story and sometimes "cartoonish" violence have been criticized, saying it detracts from the darker, authentic feel of the show and its setting. Reviews improved with later episodes as critics felt that the series had toned down its more outlandish and over the top elements in favour of a more cohesive and balanced episode structure. Matt Zoller Seitz of Vulture gave high praises to the series' second half, stating that, "A promising show has become a terrific one." Seitz later named The Get Down as the 4th best TV series of 2017, writing that it is "one of a handful of series that can be said to have devised its own language." Variety ultimately praised the show as, "a reclamation of, and a love letter to, a marginalized community of a certain era, told through the unreliable tools of romance, intuition, and lived experiences."

== Accolades ==
Category	Recipient(s)	Result	Ref.
2016 Hollywood Music in Media Awards
Best Outstanding Music Supervision – Television	Stephanie Diaz-Matos	Nominated	
2017 MPSE Golden Reel Awards
Best Music Editor – Television Short Form	Jamieson Shaw	Won	
Best Music Editor – Television Long Form	Jamieson Shaw	Nominated	
2017 Hollywood Music in Media Awards
Original Song – TV Show/Limited Series	"Power" for Elliott Wheeler, Baz Luhrmann, Homer Steinweiss, and Donna Missal	Won	
2017 Guild of Music Supervisors Awards
Best Song/Recording Created for Television	Herizen F. Guardiola, Nile Rodgers, The Americanos, Stephanie Diaz-Matos, Louie Rubio, Alex Shultz, Raja Kumari, Baz Luhrmann, and Elliott Wheeler	Won	
Best Music Supervision for Television Comedy or Musical	Stephanie Diaz-Matos	Won	

== See also ==
- Music of The Get Down
- 1970s nostalgia
