= Sacrilege (album) =

1997 remix album by Can

Remix album by Can
- Released: 20 May 1997
- Genres: Krautrock; drum and bass; downtempo; ambient house; progressive house
- Length: 103:09
- Label: Spoon Records
- Producer: Can

Can chronology
The Peel Sessions (1995)	Sacrilege (1997)	Can Live Music (Live 1971–1977) (1999)

Professional ratings
Review scores
Source	Rating
Allmusic	2.5/5 stars
The Rolling Stone Album Guide	3/5 stars
Uncut	3/5 stars

Sacrilege is a triple remix album by the krautrock band Can, released in 1997. The album was proposed by the head of the Mute Records, Daniel Miller, who remixed also participated in the project remixing a drum-and-bass version of "Oh Yeah". Sacrilege features compositions Can composed throughout their career in the 1960s-70s and remixed by "both old friends of the group and admirers from a younger generation".

The remix of "Spoon" by Sonic Youth was sampled by Tyler, The Creator for the song "Foreword" on his 4th album, Flower Boy.

== Reception ==
Michael Karoli, the guitarist of Can, liked the remix version of their work, saying "they have done the band great justice. He stood there after dinner and listened to the tapes, and danced the whole way through."

Brian Eno, who remixed "PNOOM", said he was disappointed with his own effort. The remix was created with substantial use of loops, which "destroyed the delicate balance you always kept between the mechanical and the human".

The review included in The New Rolling Stone Album Guide called the record an "excuse for Can's disciples to show respect for their forefathers. They have some fun with the source material, but they don't exactly improve on it." Sean Cooper, writing for AllMusic, highlighted Carl Craig's "Future Days", and Air Liquide's "Flow Motion".

== Track listing ==
1. "PNOOM" (Moon Up Mix) by Brian Eno – 0:56
2. "Spoon" (Sonic Youth Mix) – 6:08
3. "Blue Bag (Inside Paper)" (Toroid Mix) by François Kevorkian & Rob Rives – 6:54
4. "Tango Whiskyman" (A Guy Called Gerald Mix) – 5:12
5. "TV Spot" (Bruce Gilbert Mix) – 3:52
6. "Vitamin C" (U.N.K.L.E. Mix) – 8:20
7. "Halleluhwah" (Halleluwa Orbus 2) – 9:20
8. "Oh Yeah" (Sunroof Mix) – 8:56
9. "Unfinished" (Hiller/Kaiser/Leda Mix) – 6:01
10. "Future Days" (Blade Runner Mix) by Carl Craig – 6:08
11. "... And More" (Westbam Mix) – 6:41
12. "Father Cannot Yell" (Pete Shelley/Black Radio Mix) – 8:28
13. "Dizzy Spoon" (System 7 Mix) – 6:45
14. "Yoo Doo Right" (3P Mix) – 4:13
15. "Flow Motion" (Air Liquide Mix) – 6:15
16. "Oh Yeah" (Secret Knowledge Mix) – 9:01
