= Tutti i colori del silenzio =

Live album by Damo Suzuki's Network
- Released: July 15, 2006
- Recorded: July 15, 2006
- Genre: Experimental
- Length: 46:50
- Label: Palustre; Wallace

Tutti i colori del silenzio (in English: All the Colors of Silence) is a live concert album by Damo Suzuki's Network which was released in 2009. The album of experimental rock features their unique performance recorded in Faenza, Italy in 2006. This album is the first co-production of Palustre Records and Wallace Records.

== Track listing ==
1. "Tutti i colori del silenzio" - 46:50

== Personnel ==
Musicians featured on the album include:

- Damo Suzuki – voice
- Xabier Iriondo – electric guitar and mahai metak
- Mattia Coletti – electric guitar
- Diego Sapignoli – drum, percussions
- Andrea Belfi – electronics
