= Dead Pigeon on Beethoven Street =

1972 film

- Written by: Samuel Fuller
- Directed by: Samuel Fuller
- Starring: Glenn Corbett; Anton Diffring; Christa Lang; Stéphane Audran; Sieghardt Rupp; Alex D'Arcy
- Music by: Can (as The Can)
- Country of origin: West Germany
- Original language: English

Production
- Cinematography: Jerzy Lipman
- Editor: Liesgret Schmitt-Klink
- Running time: 102 minutes (theatrical cut); 127 minutes (director's cut)

Original release
- Release: 7 January 1973

Dead Pigeon on Beethoven Street (German: Tote Taube in der Beethovenstraße) is episode 25, season 1, of Tatort, a German police procedural television program, directed by Samuel Fuller. It was given a theatrical release in the United States by Emerson Film Enterprises in 1975. A novelisation by Fuller appeared in the United States.

== Overview ==
When an American private detective is killed in Germany while in possession of incriminating photos, his partner (Glenn Corbett) seeks revenge. Teaming up with the seductive blonde (Christa Lang) who appeared in the photos, the investigator hopes to discover who was behind them, and why his partner was killed for having them.

In the German version, the figure Kressin who appears in six further episodes of Tatort was the title police officer, but in this episode he appears only at the beginning of the film.

== Production history ==
Fuller was offered the opportunity to direct an episode of the popular German crime drama by film critic (and later writer/director) Hans-Christoph Blumenberg in appreciation of the director's help in securing interviews with filmmakers Howard Hawks and John Ford for a documentary project. Upon meeting with the program's producers and feeling initial doubts about being able to conform to the show's standard template, he suggested a storyline inspired by the then-recent Profumo affair in England, which the producers approved to Fuller's surprise.

Fuller's screenplay took liberties with the established style of the show by eliminating a primary series protagonist early in the episode in order to introduce a one-time American character to helm the investigation, by conducting the majority of the program in English rather than German (though subtitles were provided in the German broadcast), and by ultimately treating the story with a satirical and often broadly comic tone.

The German krautrock band Can did the soundtrack for the film, with one of their most popular songs, "Vitamin C," play over the final scene.

== Restoration ==
In March 2015, the UCLA Film and Television Archive premiered a restored director's cut which added additional footage previously unseen in its television broadcast or theatrical release.
