= Vitamin C (song) =

1972 song by Can

- German single picture sleeve (1973)

Single by Can

from the album Ege Bamyası
- B-side: "I'm So Green"
- Released: 1972
- Studio: Inner Space Studio (Weilerswist, West Germany)
- Genre: Krautrock
- Length: 3:32
- Label: United Artists
- Producer: Holger Czukay

Can singles chronology
"Spoon" (1971)	"Vitamin C" (1972)	"Moonshake" (1973)

Audio
- "Vitamin C" on YouTube

"Vitamin C" is a song by the krautrock band Can from their 1972 album Ege Bamyası. The song is one of the band's most recognizable songs.

== Background ==
Can recorded and released "Vitamin C" in the first half of 1972 as a follow up to the success of their previous single "Spoon". The release of "Vitamin C" was paired with another single "I'm So Green".

When Can was commissioned to perform a piece for the soundtrack for 1973 German television film Dead Pigeon on Beethoven Street, the band settled on "Vitamin C" as their commission work, believing it fit the film well. A version of the song appeared as "Dead Pigeon Suite" on the 2012 compilation album The Lost Tapes, which features the studio out-takes recorded by Can.

== Legacy ==
=== Covers ===
British musical outfit U.N.K.L.E. created an 8-minute remix version of "Vitamin C", featured on Can's double remix album Sacrilege (1997).

=== Soundtracks ===
"Vitamin C" has been prominently featured in film soundtracks, appearing in Pedro Almodóvar's 2009 film Broken Embraces, in Jonny Greenwood's soundtrack for 2014 film Inherent Vice, in the second season of Preacher (2016–19), in the 2017 film Hot Summer Nights, in the second season of the HBO Max series Euphoria (2019), in Guy Ritchie's 2019 film The Gentlemen, in the first episode of the 2024 Netflix miniseries Eric and in the 2025 film We Bury the Dead.

"Vitamin C" has been incorporated into The Get Down: Original Soundtrack for the 2016 Netflix series of the same name, used as the theme song for Jaden Smith's character Dizzee. It features the lyric "Hey you! You're losing, you're losing..." but instead of "vitamin C" the lyrics were altered to "your mind".

=== In popular culture ===
In the manga JoJo's Bizarre Adventure, a character named Damo Tamaki has an ability named "Vitamin C". The song was used throughout the Celine Summer 2022 fashion collection show.
