= Soundtracks (Can album) =

Compilation album by Can
- Released: September 1970
- Recorded: November 1969 – August 1970
- Studios: Schloss Nörvenich (Nörvenich, West Germany)
- Genre: Krautrock
- Length: 35:09
- Labels: Liberty; United Artists
- Producer: Can

Can chronology
Monster Movie (1969)	Soundtracks (1970)	Tago Mago (1971)

Singles from Soundtracks
- 1. "Soul Desert" / "She Brings the Rain" Released: 1969

Soundtracks is a 1970 compilation album by the German krautrock group Can, containing music written for various films. The album marks the departure of the band's original vocalist Malcolm Mooney, who sings on two tracks, and his replacement by Damo Suzuki. "Don't Turn the Light On, Leave Me Alone" features Suzuki's first recorded performance with the band. Stylistically, the record also documents the group's transition to the more meditative and experimental mode of the studio albums that followed.

The back cover of the album states:

"CAN SOUNDTRACKS" is the second album of THE CAN but not album no. two ... Album no. two [Tago Mago] will be released in the beginning of 1971.

== Background and production ==
When working on soundtracks, Can usually let keyboardist Irmin Schmidt watch the films with the director, discuss it, and conceptualize the music, while the rest of the band went blind into the recording process.

Can recorded a demo version of "She Brings the Rain", the earliest song from Soundtracks, during a residency in Switzerland in mid-1969. They were invited there by stage director Max Ammann, who had recently received a position at the Schauspielhaus Zürich and requested them to supply music for the premiere of Heiner Müller's adaptation of Aeschylus' Prometheus Bound. Ammann connected with Can through his acquaintance with Schmidt, who had composed the music for Ammann's production of a Bertolt Brecht play in Munich the previous year; Ammann had been impressed by the band's "Father Cannot Yell" from their 1968 debut album Monster Movie. The initial version of "She Brings the Rain" was taped in a Zürich cellar in November 1969; the song was re-recorded in December for the 1969 film A Big Grey-Blue Bird (edited by Peter Przygodda, a friend of Schmidt).

"Mother Sky" was commissioned by director Jerzy Skolimowski, who had been impressed by the Monster Movie track "Yoo Doo Right". Skolimowski wanted an extended track for a lengthy sequence of "totally different scenes all kept together" in his 1970 film Deep End. Schmidt thought it would be fitting to underpin these scenes with a steady "motorik" rhythm and "then according to every scene, very abruptly, changing what's on top of it".

In August 1970, Przygodda asked Can to provide music for another film he was editing, the spaghetti Western Deadlock (directed by Roland Klick). Przygodda felt that Klick's original plan to improvise the entire soundtrack on guitar himself was a "self-indulgence too far". They were asked at short notice, as the film was already on the mixing board and the date of release was fixed. Klick tried to interject into their recording process, but the band convinced him that it would be completed on time only in his absence. They created the parts in the span of a single night, and Schmidt flew to Berlin to deliver the recordings and assist with the mix the following morning. One of the resulting tracks, "Tango Whiskyman", appears in the film on a seven-inch single carried by the character Kid and repeatedly spun on a turntable. At one point, Kid force-feeds whisky and makes another character dance as bullets explode around his feet, hence the track's title.

== Composition ==
"She Brings the Rain" has been characterized as "jazz-inflected" and "the most simply romantic music Can ever made". The song has a simple composition, involving a walking bassline and gloomy-sounding minor guitar chords. Toward the end, guitarist Michael Karoli overdubs a solo. Can biographer Rob Young remarked that "She Brings the Rain" was "one of the most 'mainstream' songs Can ever made" and a rare example of only some of the band (Czukay, Karoli and Mooney) being featured on a track; additionally, he called it a "distant cousin" to the song "Everybody Wants to Be a Cat" from the 1970 Disney animated film The Aristocats.

Can biographer Rob Young described "Tango Whiskyman" as a tribute to the "funereal bombast of Ennio Morricone" and highlighted the "heat-haze shimmer" of Schmidt's organ on the track. The instrumental "Deadlock (Titelmusik)" closes Deadlock with echoing tom-toms and solemn keys. Schmidt adapted a piece by Johann Sebastian Bach from the St Matthew Passion with additional harmonies.

== Reception ==
Professional ratings
Review scores
Source	Rating
AllMusic	4/5 stars
Pitchfork	7.6/10
The Rolling Stone Album Guide	3.5/5 stars
Spin Alternative Record Guide	8/10
Stylus Magazine	B

In a retrospective review in Stylus Magazine, Nick Southall called Soundtracks "a strange beast of a record" that "appear[s] directionless" but has some "absolutely sublime moments". Dominique Leone opined in a retrospective review for Pitchfork that while many of the tracks on Soundtracks lack the "artistic reach" Can achieved on Monster Movie and other albums, they are not "throwaways". Leone chose "Mother Sky" as the album's highlight, asserting that it "has an intensity matching anything on the debut". In another retrospective review of Soundtracks, for AllMusic, Jason Ankeny remarked that "The dichotomy between the two singers is readily apparent: Suzuki's odd, strangulated vocals fit far more comfortably into the group's increasingly intricate and subtle sound, allowing for greater variation than Mooney's stream-of-consciousness discourse."

In March 2005, Q placed "Mother Sky" at number 48 in its list of the "100 Greatest Guitar Tracks".

=== Legacy ===
"She Brings the Rain" was later featured in Wim Wenders' 1994 film Lisbon Story, Oskar Roehler's 2000 film Die Unberührbare, Tran Anh Hung's 2010 film Norwegian Wood, and the second episode of Euphoria's second season.

== Track listing ==
Side 1
No.	Title	Writer(s)	Length
1.	"Deadlock" (from the film Deadlock, 1970, dir. Roland Klick)	Czukay, Karoli, Liebezeit, Schmidt, Suzuki	3:27
2.	"Tango Whiskyman" (from the film Deadlock)	Czukay, Karoli, Liebezeit, Schmidt, Suzuki	4:04
3.	"Deadlock (Titelmusik)" (from the film Deadlock)	Czukay, Karoli, Liebezeit, Schmidt, Suzuki	1:40
4.	"Don't Turn the Light On, Leave Me Alone" (from the film Cream – Schwabing Report, 1970, dir. Leon Capetanos)	Czukay, Karoli, Liebezeit, Schmidt, Suzuki	3:42
5.	"Soul Desert" (from the film The Brutes, 1970, dir. Roger Fritz)	Czukay, Karoli, Liebezeit, Schmidt, Mooney	3:48

Side 2
No.	Title	Writer(s)	Length
6.	"Mother Sky" (from the film Deep End, 1971, dir. Jerzy Skolimowski)	Czukay, Karoli, Liebezeit, Schmidt, Suzuki	14:31
7.	"She Brings the Rain" (from the film A Big Grey-Blue Bird, 1969, dir. Thomas Schamoni)	Czukay, Karoli, Mooney	4:04
Total length:			35:16

== Personnel ==
Can

- Holger Czukay – bass guitar, double bass
- Michael Karoli – electric guitar, violin
- Jaki Liebezeit – drums, percussion, flute
- Irmin Schmidt – keyboards, electronics
- Malcolm Mooney – lead vocals (5, 7)
- Damo Suzuki – lead vocals (1, 2, 4, 6), percussion
