= Spoon (Can song) =

- German single picture sleeve (1972)

Single by Can

from the album Ege Bamyasi
- B-side: "Shikako Maru Ten"
- Released: Early 1972
- Studio: Inner Space Studio, Weilerswist, near Cologne
- Genre: Krautrock
- Length: 3:03
- Label: United Artists
- Songwriter: Can
- Producer: Can

Can singles chronology
"Halleluhwah" (1971)	"Spoon" (1972)	"Vitamin C" (1972)

Music video
- "Spoon" (Official Audio) on YouTube

"Spoon" is a song by krautrock group Can, recorded in 1971. It was originally released as a single with the song "Shikako Maru Ten" on the B-side. "Spoon" also appeared as the final track to the band's album Ege Bamyasi later that year.

The song marked Can's first recorded use of drum machine coupled with live drums, an unusual feature in popular music at the time. The single reached #6 on the German singles chart in early 1972 as the signature theme of the popular German television thriller Das Messer [wd] (1971). The single sold in excess of 300,000 copies. Due to the single's success, Can played a free concert at Kölner Sporthalle in Cologne on February 3, 1972.

== Recording ==
After their success with Das Millionenspiel (1970) soundtrack, Can got a commission to record the theme song for the future installment directed by Rolf von Sydow and titled Das Messer (The Knife). "Spoon" became the first complete song recorded in the Can's new studio in Weilerswist. The song's name, according to Holger Czukay, was chosen as "a companion to the knife, less aggressive".

Can recorded an eight-minute version of "Spoon", later entitled "Messer, Scissors, Fork and Light" and released on The Lost Tapes.

Rolf von Sydow, director for Das Messer, didn't think the song would fit the miniseries, saying "he wanted commercial music, not some avant-garde music", while the producers and head of department "loved it and said, no matter what the director says, this music should remain—it's fabulous". Sydow wanted to withdraw his name if this music defaced his film.

== Legacy ==
"Spoon" was featured in Lynne Ramsay's 2002 film adaptation of Morvern Callar. American indie rock band Spoon took their name from this song, and Can themselves used the name for their own record label Spoon Records.

"Spoon" was remixed by both Sonic Youth and System 7 for Can's 1997 remix album, Sacrilege. Elements of Sonic Youth's remix are sampled in Tyler, the Creator's "Foreword" from his 2017 album Flower Boy.
