= Damo Suzuki =

Japanese singer (1950–2024)

Damo Suzuki ダモ鈴木
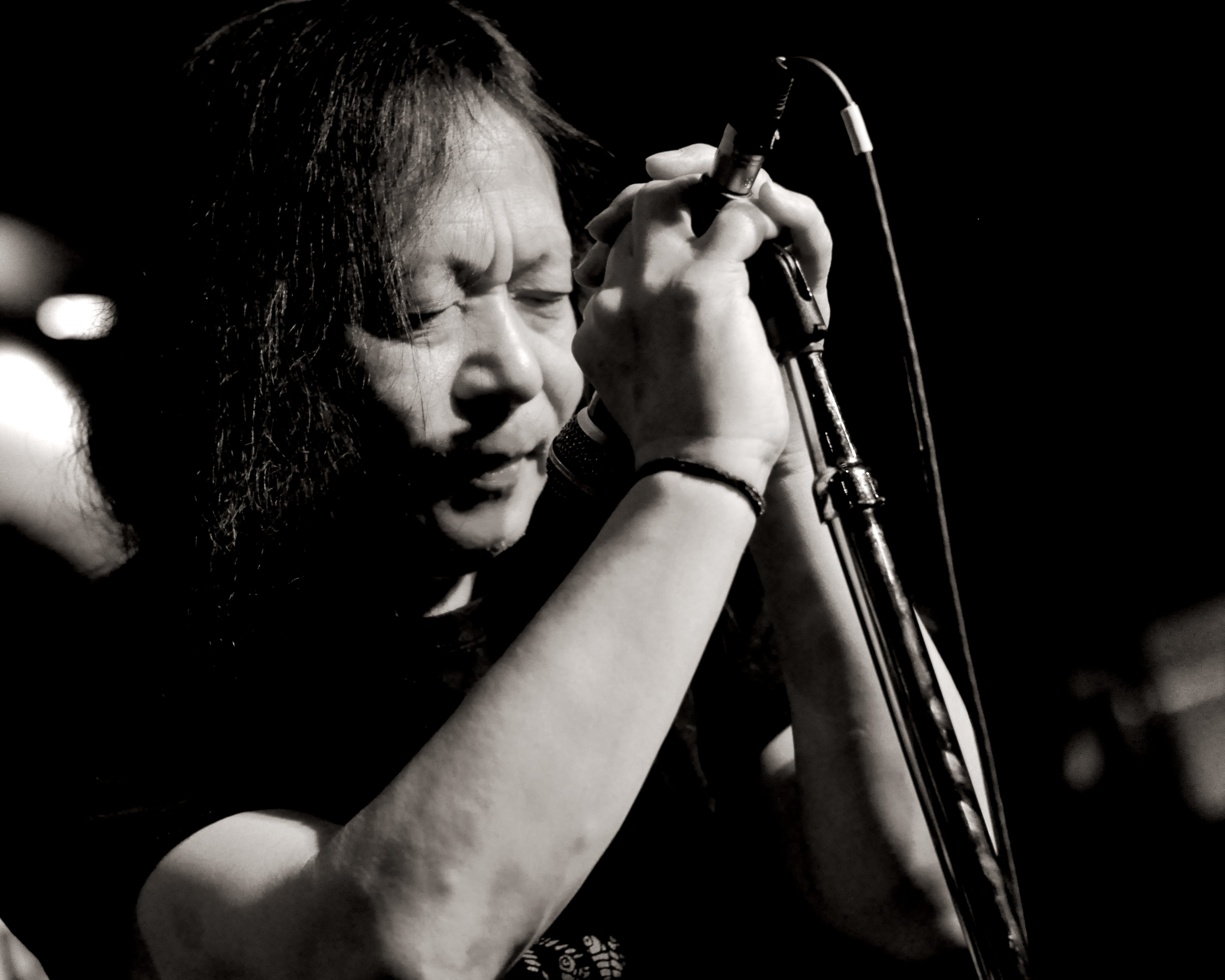
- Suzuki in 2012

Background information
- Born: Kenji Suzuki; 16 January 1950; Kobe, Japan
- Died: 9 February 2024 (aged 74) Cologne, Germany
- Genres: Krautrock; experimental rock; avant-garde rock; progressive rock
- Occupation: Singer
- Years active: 1970–1974, 1983–2024
- Website: damosuzuki.com

Kenji Suzuki (鈴木健次, Suzuki Kenji; 16 January 1950 – 9 February 2024), known as Damo Suzuki (ダモ鈴木), was a Japanese musician best known as the vocalist for the German Krautrock group Can between 1970 and 1973. Born in 1950 in Kobe, Japan, he moved to Europe in 1967 where he was spotted busking in Munich, West Germany, by Can bassist Holger Czukay and drummer Jaki Liebezeit. Can had just split with their vocalist Malcolm Mooney, and asked Suzuki to sing over tracks from their 1970 compilation album Soundtracks. Afterwards, he became their full time singer, appearing on the three influential albums Tago Mago (1971), Ege Bamyası (1972) and Future Days (1973).

After leaving Can in 1973, he abandoned music and became a Jehovah's Witness. Having left that organisation, he returned to music in the mid-1980s and began to tour widely. Over the following decades, Suzuki recorded a large number of albums under different aliases, which he later grouped as "Damo Suzuki's Network".

== Biography ==
Kenji Suzuki was born in Kobe, Japan on 16 January 1950. Suzuki was growing up playing several musical instruments, getting a new instrument from his sister every other birthday, since his eighth or ninth birthday when he got a flute. Suzuki additionally played a clarinet, saxophone, guitar, and organ. In his teens, Damo "gradually became dissatisfied with aspects of Japanese society and felt some kinship with the country's various protest movements," including the 1960 Anti-American protests, which sparked his political identity.

By 1967, Suzuki lived in Atsugi, Kanagawa, still feeling discontented with the Japanese culture, while "lighted on Sweden [culturally] because he was attracted by its functioning social democracy and generous welfare state". On 29 November 1967, Suzuki wrote a listing in the "penpals wanted" section of the Swedish newspaper Expressen, under the headline "Wants to study Swedish traditions". Twenty-one people from all over Sweden replied, and Suzuki chose from among them the Andersson family from Gräsmark, a tiny rural hamlet in south-western Sweden about thirty kilometres from the border with Norway. Suzuki boarded the Trans-Siberian Railway bearing his guitar, clarinet, and sax, and arrived in Gräsmark in February 1968, where he was soon joined by his friend Shuji Kawamukai. The two Japanese teenagers attracted attention of the local newspaper, Värmlands Folkblad, publishing a coverage on the Gräsmark cultural exchange in March 1968—Suzuki and Kawamukai taught the family how to prepare Japanese culinary delicacies and entertaining people of Gräsmark with musical harmony. They communicated through head and arm gestures, with a little English.

After a one-month stay in Gräsmark, Suzuki and Kawamukai moved to the Swedish town of Karlstad, hoping to extend their stay in Sweden by looking for sources of income either as judo instructors or chefs. However, Suzuki changed the plans soon after and set off on his journey across Europe spending about six months across "Germany, France, Switzerland, and Finland". By August 1969, he lived in Wexford, Ireland, for another six months, then in Seven Sisters, London. Suzuki earned money by busking and painting, and in London he sold enough paintings to afford a ticket to Munich, West Germany, where he was hired to play guitar in the local production of Hair musical, staged in early 1970. At one point, Suzuki stayed at Munich's squat occupied by the Amon Düül collective.

=== Career ===
In late May 1970, Damo Suzuki was busking outside Blow Up club in Munich when he was approached by the members of Can, Holger Czukay and Jaki Liebezeit, who invited him to join their performance that evening. Suzuki performed with the band at the Blow Up club that evening, and subsequently became a full member of the group. Suzuki later remembered the months before the encounter as "very frustrating because he was doing the same thing every day. He can't really remember what I was doing when he met Can, but every day he would do a kind of street performance or just scream because he was frustrated. But they saw me and asked me to be their singer not because they liked my voice but because they wanted somebody who looked like an alien. Japanese or Chinese people in the early seventies were seen seldom, totally different to now … They wanted me for this, they didn't know how I sang."

Suzuki didn't have time to prepare for Can's performance at Blow Up club, but the "chemistry flared up from the very start". As Holger recalled, "he started very, very calm but then he developed into a samurai fighter", and the audience "got so angry that they left the venue. There was only about thirty people left in a venue that holds fifteen hundred." Irmin Schmidt, the band's keyboardist, remembered that at first Damo had "real difficulties to see himself in this group … he had doubts that he did the right thing. That's bloody understandable! We were very disciplined workers. And he had never done discipline in his life! We sometimes felt it, but we didn't care; we just thought he is good and it's nice to have him, but if he can't make it, he can't make it—basta."

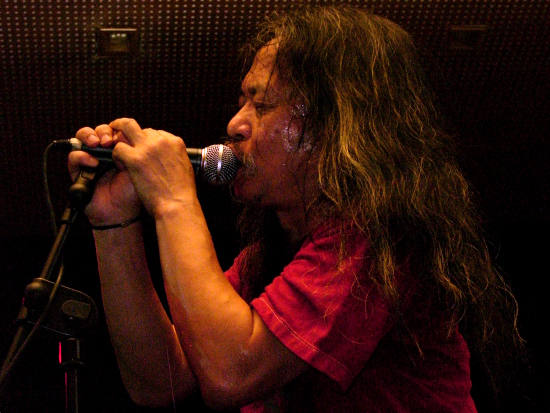
Suzuki performing live in Valencia, Spain, 2008

Suzuki's first recording with Can was "Don't Turn the Light On, Leave Me Alone" featured on Soundtracks (1970). Suzuki was a full-time member of Can from 1970 to 1973. His first album with the band was the highly influential double album Tago Mago (1971), widely considered as foundational in the development of Krautrock and a major influence on bands ranging from the Sex Pistols to Happy Mondays. Suzuki's vocals became more confident and defining with Can's 1972 album Ege Bamyası, as evidenced in the songs "Vitamin C" and "Spoon". The band developed a more atmospheric sound for Future Days (1973), their final album with Suzuki. Following the album's release, Suzuki quit the band and joined the Jehovah's Witnesses, taking a break from music for the following decade.

Suzuki returned to music in 1983, initially joining a band called Dunkelziffer, and led several solo projects collectively known as "Damo Suzuki's Network". During his solo tours, Suzuki performed live improvisational music with various local musicians, which he described as "sound carriers." Both Michael Karoli and Jaki Liebezeit had been working with Damo Suzuki post-Can, playing several concerts with Michael Karoli and Mani Neumeier of Guru Guru in Japan and the US in 1997–8.

Suzuki published his memoir I Am Damo Suzuki (named so due to the Fall song of the same title) in 2019. His career was briefly revived in 2022 following the well received album Arkaoda, recorded in conjunction with "Spiritczualic Enhancement Center" musical project.

== Personal life ==
Damo Suzuki married a Jehovah's Witness missionary in late 1972, which notably changed his behaviour. As recalled by Irmin Schmidt: "a young Japanese woman from Düsseldorf appeared at Damo's place and started working on him. She was a very successful missionary. After some time Damo got strange. Sitting in dressing rooms, reading the Bible. Got very unconcentrated on the music and objecting more and more to the most ridiculous things."

Suzuki met his second wife Elke Morsbach in Cologne in 1985. He lived in the city, although he played more shows in the United Kingdom and said that British audiences were more receptive to his music than were German ones. During his break from music, Suzuki became a Jehovah's Witness but left the organisation, considering himself a believer in the Bible without membership in any denomination or church.

While staying in Gräsmark with the Andersson family, Suzuki befriended Birgitta Engman, the daughter of the Anderssons' neighbours, who introduced him to her circle of friends. After Suzuki left Gräsmark, they kept a letter correspondence until 1972, and he wrote a handwritten lyric "For My Birgitta" in 1968. According to Birgitta, "he wanted to take her back with him to Japan and open a record shop together, but first he needed to carry on travelling around the world in order to finance the plane tickets required to attain that distant dream".

Suzuki picked up his nickname "Damo" while staying on a farm in Wexford, Ireland. The nickname is "based on a misfortune-prone anime character". He participated in the 1959-1960 Anpo protests and protests of 1968. In 2004, Suzuki told an interviewer he was an anarchist, saying he didn't believe in any kind of politician and was "not so interested in economic things and materialism, so it's my dream to continue this so that people get a feeling that brings them much more together."

Suzuki was diagnosed at 33 with colon cancer, a disease that claimed his father's life when Suzuki was five years old. He was diagnosed with colon cancer again in 2014 and given a 10% chance of survival. He died at his home in Cologne on 9 February 2024 at the age of 74. The documentary Energy explores Suzuki's battle with cancer and relationship with his wife.

== Style and legacy ==
Suzuki's free-form, often improvised, lyrics were largely indiscernible, leading many critics to think they were sung in no particular language. Suzuki's bandmate, Michael Karoli compared his singing to Billie Holiday, highlighted by "this strange, modal way of singing a very refined harmony, with some slight dissonances". According to journalist Jo Vito, Suzuki "had an innovative and inimitable approach to singing, often improvising parts sung in a variety of languages (a blend he referred to as 'the language of the Stone Age')".

The readers' poll on German music, published in the Sounds magazine in February 1972, voted Can second-best group, Tago Mago second-best album, and Damo the second-best vocalist.

The Fall's 1985 album This Nation's Saving Grace contains the song "I Am Damo Suzuki". The Fall's vocalist Mark E. Smith was an early fan of Can and became friends with Suzuki, who in 2019 used the song title for his biography I Am Damo Suzuki. The rock band the Mooney Suzuki takes its name from Suzuki and Can's earlier vocalist Malcolm Mooney.

== Discography ==
=== With Can ===
- Soundtracks (1970)
- Tago Mago (1971)
- Ege Bamyası (1972)
- Future Days (1973)

=== With Damo Suzuki's Network ===
- Tokyo on Air West 30.04.97 (1997)
- Tutti i colori del silenzio (2006)
- Start Soft (2017)

== Works cited ==
- Young, Rob; Schmidt, Irmin (2018). All Gates Open: The Story of Can (e-book ed.). London: Faber and Faber. ISBN 978-0-571-31151-4.
- Cope, Julian (1995). Krautrocksampler. Head Heritage. ISBN 0-9526719-1-3.
