= Weilerswist =

- Municipality
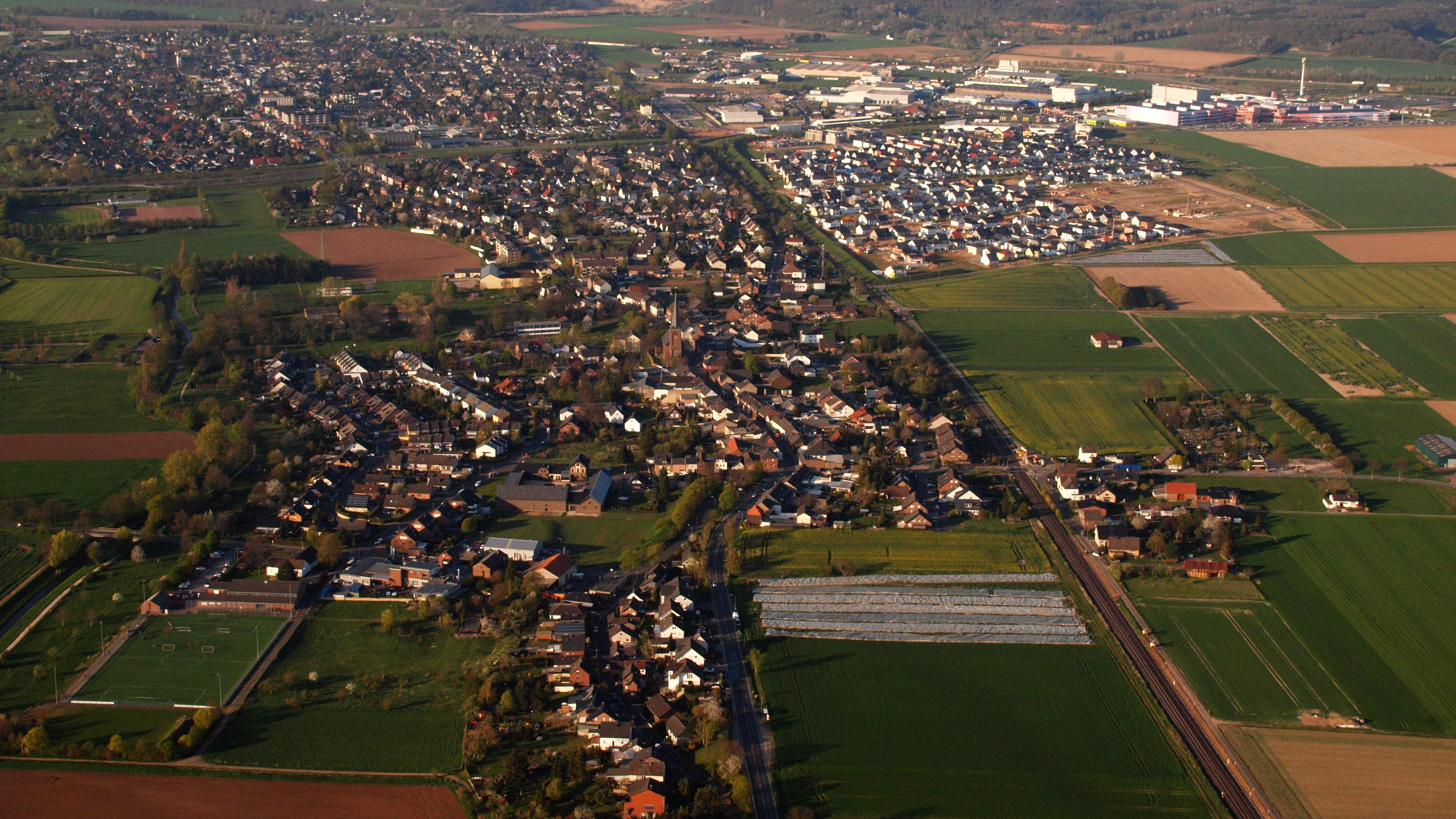
- Aerial view

- Coat of arms

- Location of Weilerswist within Euskirchen district
- Interactive map of Weilerswist
- Location within Germany Location within North Rhine-Westphalia
- Coordinates: 50°46′00″N 06°49′59″E
- Country: Germany
- State: North Rhine-Westphalia
- Admin. region: Cologne
- District: Euskirchen

Government
  - Mayor (2020–25): Anna-Katharina Horst (Ind.)

Area
  - Total: 57.17 km^{2} (22.07 sq mi)
- Elevation: 134 m (440 ft)

Population (2025-12-31)
  - Total: 18,920
  - Density: 330.9/km^{2} (857.1/sq mi)
- Time zone: UTC+01:00 (CET)
  - Summer (DST): UTC+02:00 (CEST)
- Postal codes: 53919
- Dialling codes: 02254
- Vehicle registration: EU
- Website: www.weilerswist.de

Weilerswist (German pronunciation: [ˌvaɪlɐˈsvɪst]) is a municipality in the district of Euskirchen in the state of North Rhine-Westphalia, Germany. It is located in the Eifel hills, approximately 10 kilometers north of Euskirchen, and 20 kilometers south-west of Cologne.

== Population ==
Historical population

Year	Pop.	±% p.a.
1965	10,060	—
1970	11,169	+2.11%
1975	12,166	+1.72%
1980	12,771	+0.98%
1985	13,777	+1.53%
1990	14,279	+0.72%
1995	15,314	+1.41%

Year	Pop.	±% p.a.
2000	16,335	+1.30%
2005	16,378	+0.05%
2010	16,298	−0.10%
2015	16,997	+0.84%
2020	17,722	+0.84%
2025	18,920	+1.32%

Source: Landesdatabank Nordrhein-Westfalen

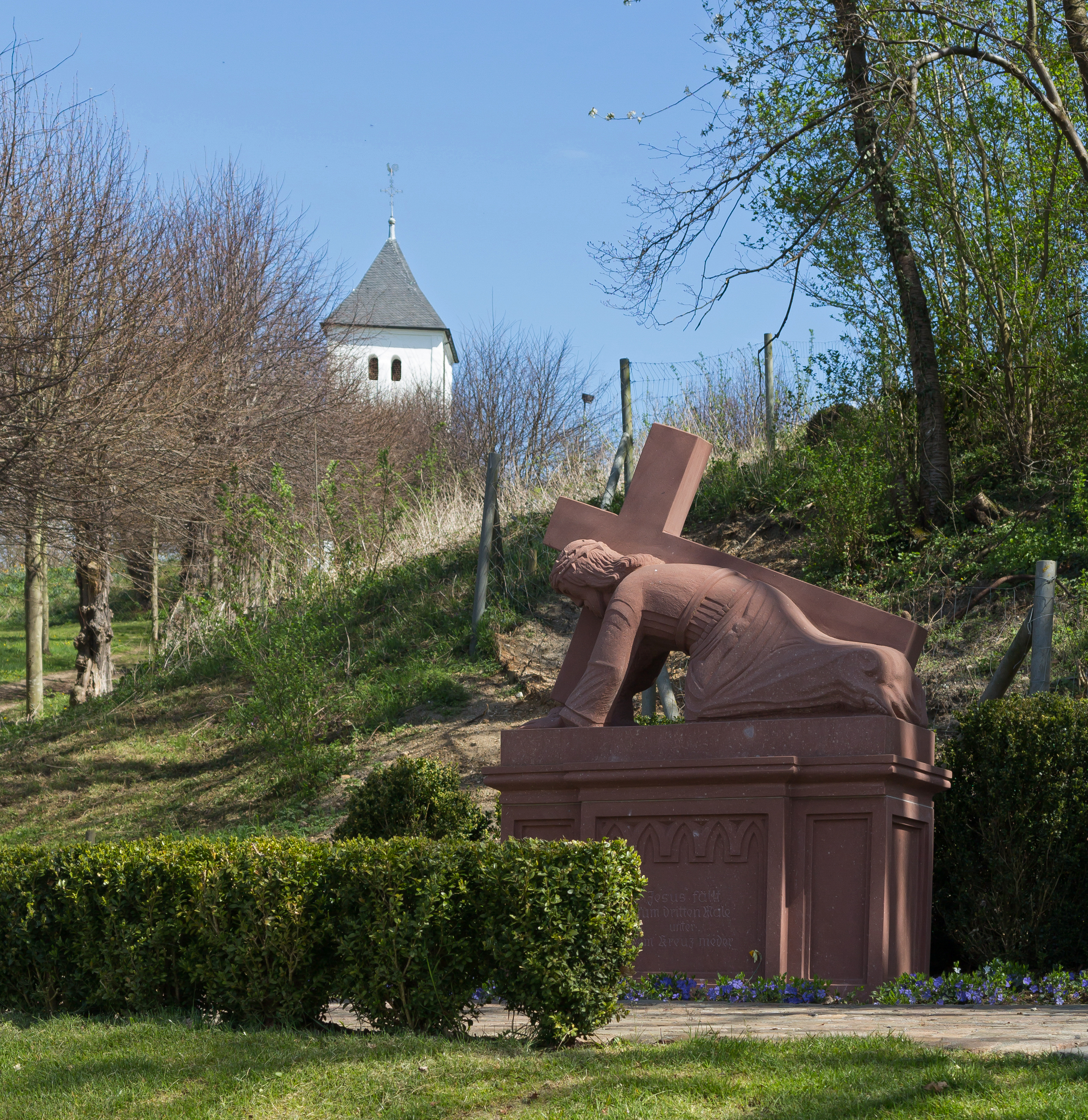
Jesus Christ and Swister Turm

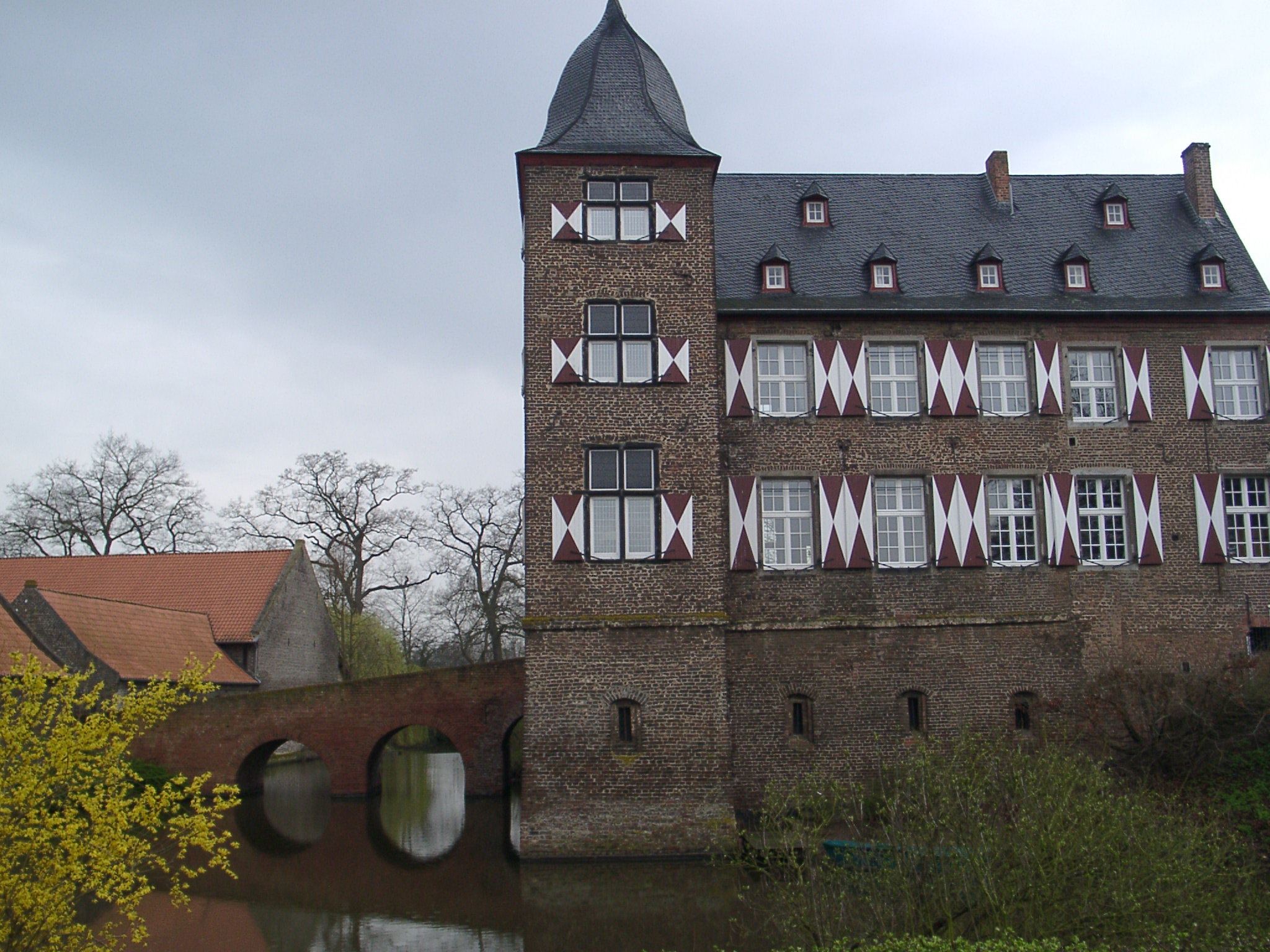
Wasserburg Kühlseggen in Weilerswist
