= Spoon Records =

Independent label

- Founded: 1979
- Founder: Hildegard Schmidt
- Genre: Independent

Spoon Records is an independent record label founded and managed by the spouse of keyboard player Irmin Schmidt, Hildegard Schmidt, since 1979. The label, and its sister publishing operation Messer Music, are headquartered in the UK mostly releasing and reissuing music made by the krautrock band Can and its members. Hildegard and Irmin Schmidt's daughter Sandra Podmore have been directors of Spoon Records since 2008.

The label takes its name from the song "Spoon" on Can's Ege Bamyasi album.

== History ==
Hildegard Schmidt decided to take control of Can's back catalogue while she attended the Midem festival in Cannes in 1979. Hildegard obtained financial support for Spoon Records from George Reinhart—film producer, photographer, and nephew of the wealthy Swiss art collector Oskar Reinhart.

Hildegard secured the rights to Can records owned by the United Artists partnered with Mute Records, a British independent label interested in European/German records. By the end of the 80s, Spoon Records released the entirety of Can's back catalogue on vinyl and CD.

== Roster ==
- Can
  - Holger Czukay
  - Michael Karoli (with Polly Eltes)
  - Jaki Liebezeit (with Phantom Band)
  - Irmin Schmidt
- Kumo

== See also ==
- List of record labels
