= Phew =

Phew may refer to:

- Phew (singer), a Japanese vocalist
  - Phew (album), the self-titled debut album
- Phew!, a 1973 solo album by Claudia Lennear
- King Phew, a character from The Illmoor Chronicles series of children's fantasy novels

== See also ==
- Whew (disambiguation)
- PU (disambiguation)
