= Tago Mago =

1971 album by Can

Studio album by Can
- Released: August 1971
- Recorded: November 1970–February 1971
- Studios: Can Studio (Schloss Nörvenich, West Germany)
- Genres: Krautrock; psychedelic rock; experimental rock; avant-funk
- Length: 73:27
- Label: United Artists
- Producer: Can

Can chronology
Soundtracks (1970)	Tago Mago (1971)	Ege Bamyası (1972)

Alternative cover
- Original UK cover and 40th anniversary edition

Tago Mago is the second studio album by the German Krautrock band Can, released in August 1971 as a double LP by United Artists Records. It was the band's first full album to include vocalist Damo Suzuki after the departure of Malcolm Mooney the year prior, though Suzuki had appeared on most tracks on the 1970 compilation album Soundtracks. Tago Mago was recorded between November 1970 and February 1971 at the Can Studio in the Schloss Nörvenich, a medieval castle near Cologne.

Tago Mago contains long-form tracks blending rock improvisation, funk rhythms, and musique concrète tape editing techniques. The album has been described as Can's best and most extreme record in sound and structure. The album has received widespread critical acclaim and is cited as an influence by various artists. Ned Raggett of AllMusic calls it "not merely one of the best Krautrock albums of all time, but one of the best albums ever, period."

== Background ==
After Malcolm Mooney left Can in December 1969, the band was left without a vocalist. While visiting Munich for a performance in early 1970, bassist Holger Czukay and drummer Jaki Liebezeit saw Kenji "Damo" Suzuki busking outside a cafe and invited him to perform with them. Suzuki performed with the band at the Blow Up Club that evening, and subsequently joined the group.

Early in 1968, the band had been invited to stay for one year rent-free at the Schloss Nörvenich, a medieval castle in Nörvenich, North Rhine-Westphalia, by art collector Christoph Vohwinkel, who had rented it with the idea of transforming it into an art center. Tago Mago was recorded by Czukay at the castle between November 1970 and February 1971.

During the sessions, Can were visited by English journalist Duncan Fallowell of The Spectator. In 1970, he published the first mainstream column about the band.

== Production and recording ==
The recording process took three months to complete. Sessions often lasted up to 16 hours a day, with Czukay editing the band's long jams into structured songs. He used a pair of two-track tape recorders to capture the sessions, which limited the band. The group favored recording in the castle's entrance hall to take advantage of its natural reverberation. Czukay used only three microphones to capture the sessions, two of them shared between Suzuki and Liebezeit and the third carefully placed in the center of the studio. Because they did not have a mixing console or a separate recording engineer, the band gathered closer to the microphones and tried to balance their levels on the fly. Czukay said that "if anyone had moved, it would've destroyed the recording. Keyboardist Irmin Schmidt experimented with oscillators in place of typical synthesizers on "Aumgn."

Tago Mago was the first Can album to contain "in-between" recordings, for which Czukay secretly recorded the band jamming during pre-production sessions. He also captured recordings of the shouts of a child who mistakenly entered the room during recording, as well as the howling of Christoph Vohwinkel's dog.

=== Name ===
According to Czukay, the album was named after Illa de Tagomago, an islet near Ibiza in the Balearic archipelago, at Liebezeit's suggestion.

== Music ==
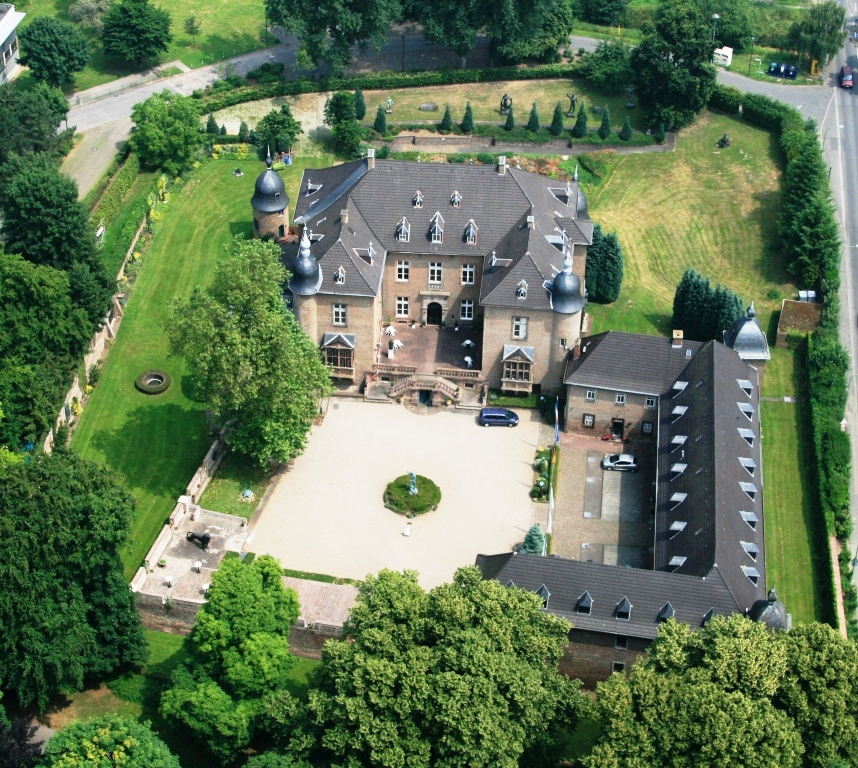
Schloss Nörvenich, where Tago Mago was recorded

Tago Mago is a double album, with the first LP more conventionally-structured and the second more experimental. Roni Sarig, author of The Secret History of Rock, called the second LP "as close as [the group] ever got to avant-garde noise music". The vocals have a subtler presence on Tago Mago as a result of the replacement of the dominant presence of Malcolm Mooney, the band's first vocalist, with Damo Suzuki. Czukay described Mooney as a "driving locomotive", stating that the band "had to follow him; couldn't stand behind him". Suzuki, by contrast, "needed a group which was pushing him."

Tago Mago draws inspiration from such sources as jazz musicians such as Miles Davis and electronic avant-garde composers such as Karlheinz Stockhausen, under whom Czukay and Schmidt had studied. The album was also inspired by the work of English occultist Aleister Crowley; it is named for Illa de Tagomago, an island that features in the Crowley legend, and the track "Aumgn" is named for Crowley's interpretation of the Hindu mantra syllable Om. In 2008, Czukay described the album as "an attempt in achieving a mystery musical world from light to darkness and return". The group has referred to the album as their "magic record," and the music has been described as having an "air of mystery and forbidden secrets."

Rob Young, Can's biographer, noticed a similarity between "Oh Yeah" and the song "Don't Turn the Light on, Leave Me Alone" from the band's 1970 compilation album Soundtracks. The tracks "Aumgn" and "Peking O", which feature Czukay's tape and radio experiments, have led music critics to call Tago Mago the group's "most extreme record in terms of sound and structure". "Peking O" also makes use of an Ace Tone Rhythm Ace, an early drum machine, combined with acoustic drumming. "Aumgn" features Schmidt's chanting instead of Suzuki's vocals. The closing track, "Bring Me Coffee or Tea," was described by Raggett as a "fine, fun little coda to a landmark record".

== Release ==
Tago Mago was released as a double album, released by United Artists Records in Germany, in August 1971. The British release, with different artwork, followed in February 1972. Initially, Can planned to edit the sessions down to a single album, leaving out the more experimental material on the second disc. However, their manager, Hildegard Schmidt, liked the material on the second record, saying it "really represented this group", and insisted they should release it on a second LP. She told United Artists and Liberty Records that the group would only allow the release of Tago Mago as a double album.

The side-long track "Halleluhwah", which closes the first disc, was shortened from 18½ to 3½ minutes for release as the B-side of the non-album single "Turtles Have Short Legs", a novelty song recorded during the Tago Mago sessions and released by Liberty Records in 1971. A different, 5½-minute edit of "Halleluhwah" would appear on the compilation Cannibalism in 1978; "Turtles Have Short Legs" remained out of print until its inclusion on Cannibalism 2 in 1992.

== Reception and legacy ==
Professional ratings
Aggregate scores
Source	Rating
Metacritic	99/100
Review scores
Source	Rating
AllMusic	5/5 stars
Drowned in Sound	10/10
The Encyclopedia of Popular Music	4/5 stars
The Great Rock Discography	8/10
Pitchfork	9.3/10 (2004); 10/10 (2011; 40th Anniversary Edition)
Record Collector	5/5 stars
The Rolling Stone Album Guide	5/5 stars
Spin Alternative Record Guide	9/10
Stylus Magazine	B
Uncut	5/5 stars

Tago Mago received critical acclaim, and is credited with pioneering various modern musical styles. Raggett called Tago Mago a "rarity of the early '70s, a double album without a wasted note." Many critics, particularly in the United Kingdom, were eager to praise the album, and by the end of 1971 Can had played their first show in the country.

Julian Cope wrote in Krautrocksampler that Tago Mago "sounds only like itself, like no-one before or after" and described the lyrics as delving "below into the Unconscious." Dummy called it "a genre-defining work of psychedelic, experimental rock music." Melody Maker critic Simon Reynolds described it as "shamanic avant-funk."

In a mixed review, Michael Watts of Melody Maker praised Tago Mago for its "strange, alien quality" as contrasted with the "placidity and unadventurousness" of Pink Floyd's recent Meddle, but lamented the lack of "any deep sense of the spirit of rock and roll in the music. It's music of the head, and not the heart."

=== Influence ===
Various artists have cited Tago Mago as an influence on their work. John Lydon of the Sex Pistols and Public Image Ltd. called it "stunning" in his autobiography Rotten: No Irish, No Blacks, No Dogs. Bobby Gillespie of the Jesus and Mary Chain and Primal Scream said of the album: "The music was like nothing I'd ever heard before, not American, not rock & roll but mysterious and European." Mark Hollis of Talk Talk called Tago Mago "an extremely important album" and an inspiration for Talk Talk's 1991 album Laughing Stock. Marc Bolan of T. Rex listed Suzuki's freeform lyricism as an inspiration. Journalist Nick Kent likened the music of Siouxsie and the Banshees on their debut album The Scream to the "ingenuity of Tago Mago", and the band's bassist Steven Severin has expressed admiration for the album. Jonny Greenwood and Thom Yorke of Radiohead have both cited the album as an early influence.

Several artists have covered songs from Tago Mago or recorded songs based on those from the album. The Flaming Lips' song "Take Meta Mars", from their 1990 album In a Priest Driven Ambulance, began as an attempt to cover "Mushroom"; however, as the band members had only heard "Mushroom" once and did not possess a copy of it, "Take Meta Mars" is only similar-sounding and not a proper cover. The Jesus and Mary Chain have covered "Mushroom" live, and a version recorded in Nuremberg in 1986 was released on the double-7"-single version of "April Skies" and later on the CD version of the compilation Barbed Wire Kisses. The Fall recorded "I Am Damo Suzuki", based on the Tago Mago track "Oh Yeah", for their 1985 album This Nation's Saving Grace. Remixes of "Oh Yeah" and "Halleluhwah" by various artists are included on the 1997 Can remix album Sacrilege.

=== Accolades ===
Tago Mago is listed in the 2005 book 1001 Albums You Must Hear Before You Die, which states: "Even after 30 years Tago Mago sounds refreshingly contemporary and gloriously extreme."

In February 1972, the British music magazine Sounds published a readers' poll on German music, where Can was voted second-best group; Tago Mago second-best album; Suzuki second-best vocalist; and Czukay and Schmidt at seventh and fifteenth in the "Musician of the Year" category respectively, with Czukay also taking fourth-best instrumentalist. "Halleluwah" reached fourth place as "track of the year", behind Kraftwerk's "Ruckzuck", Tangerine Dream's "Alpha Centauri", and Et Cetera's "Raga".

Accolades for Tago Mago
Publication/Source	Accolade	Year	Rank
Pitchfork	"Top 100 Albums of the 1970s"	2004	29
NME	"NME's The 500 Greatest Albums of All Time"	2013	409
NME	"Some of the Greatest Double LPs Ever Issued"	1991	21
Mojo	"The 100 Records That Changed the World"	2007	62
The Guardian	"1000 Albums to Hear Before You Die"	2007	-
Tom Moon	"1,000 Recordings to Hear Before You Die"	2008	-

== Track listing ==
All tracks are written by Can (Holger Czukay, Michael Karoli, Jaki Liebezeit, Irmin Schmidt and Damo Suzuki).

Side one
No.	Title	Length
1.	"Paperhouse"	7:28
2.	"Mushroom"	4:03
3.	"Oh Yeah"	7:23

Side two
No.	Title	Length
4.	"Halleluhwah"	18:32

Side three
No.	Title	Length
5.	"Aumgn"	17:37

Side four
No.	Title	Length
6.	"Peking O"	11:37
7.	"Bring Me Coffee or Tea"	6:47
Total length:		73:27

40th Anniversary Edition bonus tracks
No.	Title	Length
8.	"Mushroom" (Live 1972)	8:42
9.	"Spoon" (Live 1972)	29:55
10.	"Halleluhwah" (Live 1972)	9:12
Total length:		47:49

== Personnel ==
- Damo Suzuki – vocals
- Holger Czukay – bass guitar, engineering, editing
- Michael Karoli – electric guitar, acoustic guitar, violin
- Jaki Liebezeit – drums, double bass, piano
- Irmin Schmidt – Farfisa organ and electric piano, electronics, vocals (5)

=== Production ===
- U. Eichberger – original artwork & design
- Andreas Torkler – design (2004 rerelease)
