= Bibliography of David Lee Stone =

Bibliography of English fantasy author David Lee Stone

David Lee Stone (born 1978) is an English children's fantasy author best known for The Illmoor Chronicles. He has also written under the pen names David Grimstone and Rotterly Ghoulstone. His books have been published by, among others, Hodder Children's Books and Disney Hyperion, Penguin Razorbill in the United States, and Sony in Japan.

== The Illmoor Chronicles (2003–2007) ==
The Illmoor Chronicles is Stone's debut series, set in the fictional continent of Illmoor. After being rejected by several publishers, Stone received a £500,000 contract for the initial trilogy in 2003, and the comedic writing has been compared to that of Terry Pratchett and Douglas Adams. The series was published by Hodder Children's Books in the United Kingdom and Disney Hyperion in the United States; audio adaptations were produced for BBC Worldwide and Random House. The first two books were also released in Dutch translation as De rampzalige ratzooi (2004) and Yankergeklungel (2005).

No.	Title	Year	UK publisher	US publisher	ISBN
1	The Ratastrophe Catastrophe	2003	Hodder Children's Books	Disney Hyperion	ISBN 978-0340873427
2	The Yowler Foul-up	2004	Hodder Children's Books	Disney Hyperion	ISBN 9781444922790
3	The Shadewell Shenanigans	2005	Hodder Children's Books	Disney Hyperion	ISBN 9781444922806
4	The Dwellings Debacle	2006	Hodder Children's Books	Disney Hyperion	ISBN 9780340893685
5	The Vanquish Vendetta	2006	Hodder Children's Books	Disney Hyperion	ISBN 9781444922820
6	The Coldstone Conflict	2007	Hodder Children's Books	Disney Hyperion	ISBN 9781444922837

== Standalone / early work ==
Title	Year	Publisher	Notes	ISBN
Davey Swag	2008	Hodder Children's Books	Later reworked and reissued by Kingsbrook Publishing as Curse of the Voodoo Ostrich	ISBN 9780340917442

== Gladiator Boy series (2009–2010) ==
Written under the pen name David Grimstone, the Gladiator Boy series was published by Hodder Children's Books in the United Kingdom. The series follows Decimus Rex, a young slave who must fight his way to freedom in an ancient Roman arena.

=== Series 1 (2009) ===
No.	Title	ISBN
1	A Hero's Quest	ISBN 9780606149662
2	Escape from Evil	ISBN 9780606149679
3	Stowaway Slaves	ISBN 9781101444252
4	The Rebels' Assault	ISBN 9780606149693
5	Rescue Mission	ISBN 9780340989104
6	The Blade of Fire	ISBN 9780340989111

=== Series 2 (2010) ===
No.	Title	ISBN
1	The Living Dead	ISBN 978-0340989272
2	The Raging Torrent	ISBN 9780340989289
3	The Three Ninjas	ISBN 9780340989296
4	The Insane Fury	ISBN 9780340989302
5	The White Snake	ISBN 9780340989319
6	The Golem Army	ISBN 9780340989326

=== Series 3 (2010) ===
No.	Title	ISBN
1	The Screaming Void	ISBN 9781444900835
2	The Clone Warriors	ISBN 9781444900873
3	The Ultimate Evil	ISBN 9781444900880

== Undead Ed series (2011–2012) ==
Written under the pen name Rotterly Ghoulstone, the Undead Ed series was first published in May 2011. The three titles were published by Hodder Children's Books in the United Kingdom and Penguin Razorbill in the United States, and in Germany by Baumhaus Verlag. The series, illustrated throughout by Nigel Baines, follows thirteen-year-old zombie Ed Bagley.

No.	Title	Year	Notes	ISBN
1	Undead Ed and the Howling Moon	2011		ISBN 9781444904918
2	Undead Ed and the Demon Freakshow	2011		ISBN 9781444904925
3	Undead Ed and the Devil's Fingers	2012	Published in the United States as Undead Ed and the Fingers of Doom	ISBN 9781444904932

== Outcasts series (2016–2017) ==
Written under the pen name David Grimstone, the Outcasts series was first published in May 2016. All three volumes were published by Hodder Children's Books, which held exclusive worldwide rights to the series.

No.	Title	Year	ISBN
1	Outcasts: The Game	2016	ISBN 978-1444925364
2	Outcasts: Thunderbolt	2017	ISBN 978-1444925371
3	Outcasts: Destiny	2017	ISBN 9781444925395

== Kingsbrook Publishing works ==
In 2022, Stone and his wife Chiara founded Kingsbrook Publishing, an independent press specialising in young adult, fantasy, and children's fiction.

=== The Vanquish Trilogy (2022) ===
No.	Title	Year	ISBN
1	Shadow of the Shapeshifter	2022	ISBN 978-1739777609
2	The Venom of Vanquish	2022	ISBN 978-1739777630
3	The Might of Moltenoak	2022	ISBN 979-8360004004

=== Other works ===
Title	Year	Notes	ISBN
Too Much Information: The Hilarious Diary of an Oversharer	2022	Autobiographical/memoir work	ISBN 978-1739777661
Wrath of the Ratlord	2024	Reissue of The Ratastrophe Catastrophe (2003)	
The Lark & the Loftwing	2024	Reissue of The Yowler Foul-Up (2004)	
Dances with Drumsticks: Weird Tales from Other Places	2024	Short story collection	ISBN 979-8339003724
The Shinbone Shadowhunter	2024	Standalone Illmoor novella	
The Trials of Teethgrit	2025	Reissue of The Shadewell Shenanigans (2005)	
Bad Apples	2025	Standalone novel	ISBN 979-8307867099

== Short stories ==
Stone's short fiction has appeared in professional magazines and anthologies since 1997. Between 1997 and 2002, his work appeared in Interzone, SFX, Games Workshop's Citadel Journal, The Edge, and many others. He has also written review columns for Interzone and SFX, and fictional histories for Games Workshop and their Warhammer universe.

Title	Year	Publication	Notes
"The Dulwich Assassins"	1997	Xenos	First short story publication
"The Dulwich Assassins"	1998	Knights of Madness, ed. Peter Haining (Souvenir/Orbit)	Reprint; credited as David L. Stone. The anthology also included stories by Terry Pratchett, Tom Sharpe, Woody Allen, Ray Bradbury, and Philip K. Dick, among others.
"The Lickspittle Leviathan"	2018	Shoal: A Thanet Writers Anthology (Thanet Writers)	
