= New Decade =

Studio album by Phew
- Released: 22 October 2021
- Recorded: 2020–2021
- Studio: Studio P
- Genre: Electronic
- Length: 34:10
- Label: Mute

Phew chronology
Voice Hardcore (2017)	New Decade (2021)

New Decade is a studio album by Japanese musician Hiromi Moritani under the pseudonym Phew. It was released on 22 October 2021 through Mute Records. It received generally favorable reviews from critics.

== Background ==
Hiromi Moritani, better known as Phew, is a Japanese musician from Osaka. She started her career in the 1970s. She was a member of the band Aunt Sally.

New Decade is her first release on Mute Records since Our Likeness (1992). She recorded the album in her home studio in Kawasaki, Kanagawa, during the COVID-19 pandemic. The album consists of six tracks. As for the album's title, she stated, "Personally speaking, I've stopped being able to see a future that extends from the present."

Music videos were released for "Into the Stream" and "Days Nights". The album was released on 22 October 2021 through Mute Records.

== Critical reception ==
Professional ratings
Aggregate scores
Source	Rating
Metacritic	77/100
Review scores
Source	Rating
AllMusic	4/5 stars
Beats Per Minute	79%
PopMatters	7/10

According to the review aggregator Metacritic, New Decade received "generally favorable reviews" based on a weighted average score of 77 out of 100 from 4 critic scores.

Heather Phares of AllMusic stated, "With vocals that range from whispers to wails and almost tangible electronics, noise, and guitar, the album's pieces frequently do sound unshackled from the temporal." Miranda Remington of Beats Per Minute wrote, "New Decade comes across as bleak, but it's deliberately restrained; its meditations cut through the real sentiments of our confusing years with the sincerity of a haiku." She added, "Especially amidst isolation and the uncertainties of modernity, we are reminded of the power of self-expression."

=== Accolades ===
Year-end lists for New Decade
Publication	List	Rank	Ref.
AllMusic	Favorite Electronic Albums	—	
The Wire	Releases of the Year (2021 Rewind)	10	

== Track listing ==
All tracks are written by Phew.

New Decade track listing
No.	Title	Length
1.	"Snow and Pollen"	5:07
2.	"Days Nights"	4:13
3.	"Into the Stream"	7:14
4.	"Feedback Tuning"	6:03
5.	"Flashforward"	4:54
6.	"Doing Nothing"	6:26
Total length:		34:10

== Personnel ==
Credits adapted from liner notes.

- Phew – vocals, synthesizer, guitar, rhythm box, recording
- Hiroyuki Nagashima – rhythm (3), synthesizer, mixing
- Seiichi Yamamoto – guitar (6)
- Pete Norman – mastering
- Masayuki Shioda – photography
- Satoshi Suzuki – design
