= Halleluhwah =

"Halleluwah"
- 1971 German single cover

Single by Can

from the album Tago Mago
- A-side: "Turtles Have Short Legs"
- Released: 1971
- Recorded: Schloss Nörvenich, Cologne
- Genre: Krautrock; psychedelic funk; avant-funk
- Length: 18:32 (album version); 3:30 (single version)
- Label: United Artists
- Songwriter: Can
- Producer: Can

"Halleluwah" (alternatively titled "Halleluhwah" on some post-1989 releases) is a song by the krautrock band Can, from their 1971 album Tago Mago.

== Background ==
The track, which originally took up a whole side of long-playing vinyl record, lasts for 18 minutes and 28 seconds and is characteristic of the band's sound around 1971 in that it features a vast array of improvised guitars and keyboards, tape editing, and the rhythm section "pounding out a monster trance/funk beat". The drum beat for which the song is famous is repeated almost continuously by Jaki Liebezeit, with only minor variations, throughout the course of the 18-minute jam. In one line of the song, singer Damo Suzuki mentions all the tracks from side one of Tago Mago:

Sounds they was to go when I'm signing

"Mushroom Head", "Oh Yeah", "Paperhouse"

The original UK pressing of Tago Mago misprinted the song's title as "Hallelujah" both on the LP's centre label and on the back flap of the album jacket.

== Other versions ==
A much shorter version of the song appears as the B-side to the band's 1971 single "Turtles Have Short Legs", and a different shortened version later saw release on Can's compilation album Cannibalism. The song appears on the 1997 remix album Sacrilege, being remixed by The Orb.

On vocalist Damo Suzuki's 1998 solo album V.E.R.N.I.S.S.A.G.E, a version of this song is performed along with "Mushroom", also from Tago Mago. His band at the time featured Jaki Liebezeit on drums.

== Personnel ==
- Damo Suzuki - vocals
- Holger Czukay – bass guitar
- Michael Karoli – guitars
- Jaki Liebezeit – drums
- Irmin Schmidt – Keyboards

== Samples ==
The song's piano segment was sampled by A Tribe Called Quest on their final studio album We Got It from Here... Thank You 4 Your Service on the song "Lost Somebody".
