= Cannibalism (album) =

- Cannibalism 1 cover

Compilation album by Can
- Released: 1978, 1992, 1994
- Genre: Krautrock
- Label: United Artists/Spoon

Cannibalism is a series of compilation albums by Krautrock band Can released in three bunches in 1978, 1992, and 1994.

== Description ==
The first collection, Cannibalism 1, covers Can's early years, including works from 1969's Monster Movie to 1974's Soon Over Babaluma (excluding 1973's Future Days). It was reedited by Holger Czukay. Cannibalism 2 assembles the band's output from 1974 to 1981, also including two tracks from singles and one unreleased track, "Melting Away". Cannibalism 3 compiles solo works by Can members from 1979 to 1991.

Several tracks across the first two compilations are abridged of the original recordings.

== Reception ==
Professional ratings
Review scores
Source	Rating
Allmusic	4.5/5 (1 and 2); 3/5 (3)
The Rolling Stone Album Guide	4.5/5 (1) 3.5/5 (2) 2/5 (3)
Spin Alternative Record Guide	7/10 (all)

Jason Ankeny of AllMusic rated the first collection at 4.5 stars out of 5, praising it for preserving Can's cohesion in a compilation format and appreciating it as a "thorough overview of Can's eclectic musical history to date". Nevertheless, Ankeny opined that the shortened versions of "Mother Sky", "Aumgn", and "Halleluhwah" did not compared to the full-length renditions. The Rolling Stone Album Guide further added that it is "lovingly sequenced" and provides a "good sense of what they [Can] were up to".

AllMusic, reviewing the follow-up release, highlighted an "excellent edit" of the lengthy "Animal Waves", and a "fascinating remix" combining "I Want More" and "And More" into one piece. The final collection, Cannibalism 3, received more negative review from the Rolling Stone, which stated that the individual members were "lost without each other to curb their excesses", aside from "Czukay's perverse take" on the East German national anthem, "Der Osten 1st Rot".

== Track listings ==
=== Cannibalism 1 ===
Tracks marked [*] were edited to shorter length from the original tracks.

=== Side A ===
1. "Father Cannot Yell" – 7:05
2. "Soul Desert" – 3:30
3. "Soup" – 3:03 [*]
4. "Mother Sky" – 6:41 [*]

=== Side B ===
1. "She Brings the Rain" – 4:07
2. "Mushroom" – 4:31
3. "One More Night" – 5:37
4. "Spray" – 2:57 [*]
5. "Outside My Door" – 4:11

=== Side C ===
1. "Chain Reaction" – 5:44 [*]
2. "Halleluwah" – 5:39 [*]
3. "Aumgn" – 7:18 [*]
4. "Dizzy Dizzy" – 3:30 [*]

=== Side D ===
1. "Yoo Doo Right" – 20:20

==== Notes ====
The CD release of Cannibalism, which is contained on a single disc, does not contain the tracks "Soul Desert", "Spray", or "Chain Reaction", but adds the track "Spoon".

=== Cannibalism 2 ===
1. "Uphill" – 6:17
2. "Pnoom" – 0:25
3. "Connection" – 2:55
4. "Mother Upduff" – 3:36
5. "Little Star" – 6:27
6. "T.V. Spot" – 0:37
7. "Doko E." – 1:44
8. "Turtels Have Short Legs" – 3:14
9. "Shikaku Maru Ten" – 2:11
10. "Gomorrha" – 3:37
11. "Blue Bag" – 1:17
12. "Red Hot Indians" – 4:13
13. "Half Past One" – 3:55
14. "Flow Motion" – 3:56
15. "Smoke" – 1:51
16. "I Want More And ....." – 6:03
17. "Laugh Till You Cry" – 3:47
18. "Aspectacle" – 2:48
19. "Animal Waves" – 8:11
20. "Sunshine Day And Night" – 2:31
21. "E.F.S. No. 7" – 1:06
22. "Melting Away" – 1:32

=== Cannibalism 3 ===
1. "Neon Man" (Phantom Band) – 3:52
2. "Nervous Breakdown" (Phantom Band) – 4:46
3. "Home Truths" (Michael Karoli & Polly Eltes) – 6:03
4. "Yours & Mine" (Michael Karoli & Polly Eltes) – 4:50
5. "Cool In The Pool" (Holger Czukay) – 4:51
6. "Persian Love" (Czukay) – 6:22
7. "Witches Multiplication Table" (Czukay) – 4:53
8. "Ode To Perfume" (Czukay) – 5:46
9. "Der Osten Ist Rot" (Czukay) – 6:16
10. "Rapido De Noir" (Irmin Schmidt & Bruno Spoerri) – 6:55
11. "Love" (Irmin Schmidt) – 4:39
12. "Alcool" (Schmidt) – 5:03
13. "Le Weekend" (Schmidt) – 4:46
14. "Time The Dreamkiller" (Schmidt) – 6:12

== Personnel ==
- Holger Czukay – bass, remastering, editing
- Kay Kassel – cover designs
- Jaki Liebezeit – drums
- Michael Karoli – guitar
- Irmin Schmidt – keyboards
- Peter Gilmour – producing
- Damo Suzuki – vocals
- Malcolm Mooney – vocals
- Duncan Fallowell – compiling, editing
- René Tinner – remastering
