= Our Likeness =

Studio album by Phew
- Released: 1992
- Recorded: January–March 1992
- Studio: Conny Plank's studio
- Length: 37:33
- Label: Mute

Phew chronology
View (1987)	Our Likeness (1992)	Himitsu no Knife (1995)

Our Likeness is a studio album by Japanese musician Hiromi Moritani under the pseudonym Phew. It was released in 1992 through Mute Records.

== Background ==
Hiromi Moritani, better known as Phew, is a Japanese musician from Osaka. She was a vocalist of the Japanese band Aunt Sally. She previously released her solo albums Phew (1981) and View (1987). Our Likeness is her third solo album.

When Phew recorded her music at Conny Plank's studio in Cologne in 1981, she met Chrislo Haas. At the end of the 1980s, Haas visited Phew in Tokyo, and they decided to make music together. Our Likeness was recorded in Plank's studio, from January to March 1992. It features contributions from Haas on keyboards, Alexander Hacke on guitar, Jaki Liebezeit on drums, and Thomas Stern on bass guitar. It consists of eleven tracks.

== Release ==
The album was originally released in 1992 through Mute Records. It was reissued on 17 February 2023 through the label, on CD, on limited edition clear vinyl, and on digital formats.

== Critical reception ==
Professional ratings
Review scores
Source	Rating
AllMusic	4.5/5 stars
Pitchfork	8.3/10
Spectrum Culture	75%

Kelly Doherty of The Vinyl Factory wrote, "A spiritual precursor to the spiky, brash dance-punk of the early '00s while channelling a crushing metal adjacent atmosphere, Our Likeness is confrontational, intense music at its finest." Heather Phares of AllMusic stated, "Opting for a set of discrete experiments instead of the more cohesive feel of some of her later work, Our Likeness falls somewhere in between Phew's improvisations and the more structured pieces of 1987's View." She called the album "a tour de force from an artist whose imaginative spirit always burns bright."

=== Accolades ===
Year-end lists for Our Likeness
Publication	List	Rank	Ref.
AllMusic	Favorite Archival Releases	—	
The Vinyl Factory	Our Favourite Compilations and Reissues of 2023	—	

== Track listing ==
All lyrics are written by Phew; all music is composed by Chrislo Haas, Alexander Hacke, Jaki Liebezeit, Thomas Stern, and Phew.

Our Likeness track listing
No.	Title	Length
1.	"The Last Song"	3:24
2.	"Our Likeness"	3:52
3.	"Being"	2:59
4.	"Like Water and Water"	3:38
5.	"Glitter of Night"	1:59
6.	"Spring"	3:40
7.	"Smell"	3:36
8.	"Depth of the Forehead"	3:54
9.	"Our Element"	2:49
10.	"Expression"	3:58
11.	"Ocean"	3:44
Total length:		37:33

== Personnel ==
Credits adapted from liner notes.

- Phew – vocals
- Chrislo Haas – keyboards, saxophone (4), ambient noise (7, 10)
- Alexander Hacke – guitar, piano (4), ambient noise (7, 10), concept
- Jaki Liebezeit – drums, percussion, ambient noise (7, 10), piano (11)
- Thomas Stern – bass guitar
- Ingo Krauss – engineering
- Krista Fast – coordination
- Designland – sleeve
- Jürgen Sieckmeyer – photography
