= Mushroom (song) =

Song by Can

from the album Tago Mago
- Released: 1971
- Studio: Inner Space Studio, Cologne
- Genre: Krautrock
- Length: 4:08
- Label: United Artists
- Producer: Can

"Mushroom" is a song by the German krautrock band Can, from their 1971 album Tago Mago. It's the shortest song on the album, lasting for 4 minutes and 8 seconds. A video was made for the track which has been shown on MTV.

== Content ==
The song has a hypnotic and repetitive structure, where vocalist Damo Suzuki, up-close to his microphone, chants "When I saw mushroom head / I was born, I was dead" and "When I saw skies are red / I was born, I was dead" during the verses. For the chorus, he yells "I'm gonna give my despair".

Rob Young, Can's biographer, described Damo's lyricism on the "Mushroom" as his "seldom cut to the existential", referencing red skies, the mushroom shape of the title, "overtones of nuclear unease". This idea is reinforced by the sound of a bomb explosion that abruptly ends the song. According to Michael Karoli, the explosion was created using firecrackers and "slowing them down to around one-sixteenth their normal speed".

== Personnel ==
- Damo Suzuki – vocals
- Holger Czukay – bass
- Michael Karoli – guitar
- Jaki Liebezeit – drums, double bass
- Irmin Schmidt – Farfisa organ, electric piano, synthesizer

== Cover versions ==
The song "Don't Forget Ya Job" from 1998 album V.E.R.N.I.S.S.A.G.E by Damo Suzuki incorporates "Mushroom", along with another Tago Mago song, "Halleluhwah". Szuki's band at the time featured Can's Jaki Liebezeit on drums.

The Serbian and former Yugoslav space rock band Igra Staklenih Perli covered the song on their eponymous debut album in 1979. The Swedish band Komeda released a cover of the song with their 1998 single "It's Alright, Baby". The song was covered by the band The Jesus and Mary Chain. A version recorded live in Nuremberg in 1986 was first released on the double-7"-single version of "April Skies". It was later reissued on the CD version of Barbed Wire Kisses, and then on the 2011 expanded version of Darklands.

The Flaming Lips' song "Take Meta Mars" from In a Priest Driven Ambulance is closely modeled on "Mushroom".
