= Hubert Türk =

German politician

Hubert Türk (January 31, 1925, in Nörvenich – June 15, 2011, in Bergisch Gladbach) was a German politician and member of Parliament (CDU).

== Life and early career ==
Türk attended elementary school as well as high school during the Second World War and despite the interruption of military service as well as imprisonment, he was finally able to get his diploma in 1949. He then continued his studies at the Veterinary School in Hannover, passed the Staatsexamen (state exam) in 1956, and additionally obtained his doctorate in veterinary medicine in 1957. After working as a veterinarian and for a veterinary-government agency, he then worked at an insurance company. He is the brother of author and Heimatforscher Karl Heinz Türk.

Türk was a member of the CDU from 1964 onwards and he belonged to numerous other party committees.

== Political career ==
Türk was a member of the state parliament of the federal state of North Rhine-Westphalia from May 28, 1975, until May 28, 1980. He was a member of the committee for work, health, social services, petitions and sports, as well as for matters relating to refugees. He was directly elected in the electoral district 028 Rheinisch-Bergisch district II.

He belonged to the Rheinisch-Bergischer district from 1969 to 1974.
