= Motion picture (disambiguation) =

Motion picture is a visual art consisting of moving images.

It may also refer to:

- Motion Picture Magazine, a magazine
- Motion Picture (album), an album

== See also ==
- Moving pictures (disambiguation)
