= Moving Pictures =

Moving Pictures may refer to:

== Film, television and theatre ==
- Moving pictures or film, a story conveyed with moving images
- Moving Pictures (TV series), a 1990s British programme devoted to film
- Moving Pictures (originally Glasshouses), a 1981 play by Stephen Lowe
- Moving Pictures, a 1999 play by Sharon Pollock

== Literature ==
- Moving Pictures (magazine), an American film and film industry periodical
- Moving Pictures (novel), a 1990 Discworld novel by Terry Pratchett
- Moving Pictures (webcomic), a late 2000s webcomic by Kathryn and Stuart Immonen
- Moving Pictures, an autobiography by Ali MacGraw

== Music ==
- Moving Pictures (band), an Australian rock group
- Moving Pictures (Rush album), 1981
- Moving Pictures (Holger Czukay album), 1993
- Moving Pictures (Ravi Coltrane album), 1998
- "Moving Pictures" (The Kinks song), a 1979 song
- "Moving Pictures" (The Cribs song), a 2007 song
- "Moving Pictures", a 2002 song by Fall Out Boy from Fall Out Boy's Evening Out with Your Girlfriend

== See also ==
- Film (disambiguation)
- Movie (disambiguation)
