= Blessed Easter =

1987 musical single by Holger Czukay

"Blessed Easter" is a 1987 musical single by Holger Czukay, from his album Rome Remains Rome (1987). The song is notable for sampling the voice of Pope John Paul II.

== Lyrics ==
The song features a musical sample of Pope John Paul II's sermon during the Easter celebrations. Parts of the speech are in Latin, English and German. Czukay added a lounge beat and some odd effects.

Czukay happened to watch the broadcast on television and recorded it from his TV set. He mentioned the pope in the liner notes of his album Rome Remains Rome as Popestar Wojtyla and his swinging nuns.

== Music video ==
The song was released with a music video which features archive footage of Pope John Paul II during public appearances. The video closes with trick footage of the pope kneeling down to pray while Czukay kneels in front of him and takes out the pope's wallet, after which he quietly walks away.

The song met with some controversy at the time.
