= Der Osten ist Rot =

Studio album by Holger Czukay
- Released: 1984
- Studios: Can Studio, Cologne, Germany
- Genre: Krautrock
- Length: 39:05
- Label: Virgin

Holger Czukay chronology
| Snake Charmer (1983) | Der Osten ist Rot (1984) | Rome Remains Rome (1987) |

Professional ratings
Review scores
| Source | Rating |
|---|---|
| Allmusic | 3/5 stars |

Der Osten ist Rot is the fourth album by Holger Czukay, released in 1984 through Virgin Records.

== Accolades ==
| Year | Publication | Country | Accolade | Rank |
|---|---|---|---|---|
| 1984 | NME | United Kingdom | "Albums of the Year" | 36 |

== Track listing ==
Side one
| No. | Title | Writer(s) | Length |
|---|---|---|---|
| 1. | "The Photo Song" | Czukay | 3:40 |
| 2. | "Bänkel Rap 82" | Czukay | 5:27 |
| 3. | "Michy" | Czukay | 3:41 |
| 4. | "Rhönrad" | Czukay, Liebezeit | 1:36 |
| 5. | "Collage" | Czukay, Liebezeit, Plank | 3:27 |
| 6. | "Esperanto Socialiste" | Czukay, Liebezeit | 1:38 |

Side two
| No. | Title | Writer(s) | Length |
|---|---|---|---|
| 1. | "Der Osten ist Rot" (The East Is Red) | Nie Er; arranged by Czukay and Liebezeit | 5:55 |
| 2. | "Das Massenmedium" | Czukay, Liebezeit | 3:52 |
| 3. | "Schaue vertrauensvoll in die Zukunft" | Czukay | 2:23 |
| 4. | "Träum' mal wieder!" | Czukay | 7:26 |

The seventh track is credited on the album as "The East Is Red", but is in fact a cover / remix of "March of the Volunteers".

== Legacy ==
According to Rambo Amadeus, the person who coined the word turbofolk, the genre itself was first conceived with this album.

== Personnel ==
Musicians

- Holger Czukay – vocals, guitar, bass guitar, organ, mixing, recording
- Jaki Liebezeit – drums, trumpet, piano, organ
- Michy – vocals, organ
- Conny Plank – synthesizer

Production and additional personnel

- Harald Hoffmann – painting
- René Tinner – recording
