= Radio Wave Surfer =

Studio album by Holger Czukay
- Released: 1991
- Recorded: 1984–1987
- Genre: Electronic
- Length: 34:00 (original CD edition); 41:12 (2006 CD edition)
- Label: Virgin
- Producer: Holger Czukay

Holger Czukay chronology
Flux + Mutability (1989)	Radio Wave Surfer (1991)	Moving Pictures (1993)

Professional ratings
Review scores
Source	Rating
Allmusic	2/5 stars

Radio Wave Surfer is the sixth album by Holger Czukay, released in 1991 through Virgin Records.

== Track listing ==
All tracks are written by Holger Czukay

No.	Title	Length
1.	"Rhine Water"	1:06
2.	"It Ain't No Crime"	4:26
3.	"I Get Weird Dreams"	3:39
4.	"Saturday Night Movie"	2:38
5.	"Dr Oblivion"	0:49
6.	"We Can Fight All Night"	1:23
7.	"Get It Sweet"	2:13
8.	"Ride a Radio Wave"	5:36
9.	"Atmosphere Tuning"	3:20
10.	"Voice of Bulgaria"	1:50
11.	"Late Night Show"	3:42
12.	"Through the Freezing Snow"	1:42
13.	"Encore"	2:22

2006 CD reissue Bonus Tracks
No.	Title	Length
14.	"Mono Tone"	6:42

== Personnel ==
- Sheldon Ancel – vocals
- Holger Czukay – French horn, bass guitar, organ, production
- Michael Karoli – guitar
- Ursula Kloss – illustrations
- Jaki Liebezeit – drums
