= On the Way to the Peak of Normal =

Studio album by Holger Czukay
- Released: 1981
- Studio: Inner Space Studio, Cologne, Germany
- Genre: Art rock, krautrock, psychedelic rock, electronic
- Length: 36:23
- Label: Electrola
- Producer: Holger Czukay

Holger Czukay chronology
Movies (1979)	On the Way to the Peak of Normal (1981)	Full Circle (1982)

Professional ratings
Review scores
Source	Rating
Allmusic	4/5 stars
Spin	5/10 stars
Uncut	5/5 stars

On the Way to the Peak of Normal is the third album by Holger Czukay, released in 1981 through Electrola.

== Track listing ==
All tracks are written by Holger Czukay, except "Witches' Multiplication Table" by Conny Plank

Side one
No.	Title	Length
1.	"Ode to Perfume"	18:00

Side two
No.	Title	Length
1.	"On the Way to the Peak of Normal"	7:32
2.	"Witches' Multiplication Table"	4:52
3.	"Two Bass Shuffle"	2:15
4.	"Hiss 'n' Listen"	4:50

== Personnel ==
- Holger Czukay – vocals, guitar, organ, vocoder, bass guitar, French horn, flute, harmonica, congas, production, engineering, mixing, recording, drums on "Two Bass Shuffle"
- Eveline Grunwald – design
- Uwe Jahnke – guitar on "On the Way to the Peak of Normal"
- Jaki Liebezeit – drums
- Conny Plank – synthesizer violin
- Stephan Plank – illustrations, design
- Uli Putsch – bass guitar on "On the Way to the Peak of Normal"
- Harry Rag – vocals on "On the Way to the Peak of Normal"
- Jah Wobble – bass guitar on "Hiss 'n' Listen"
- Jürgen Wolter – organ on "On the Way to the Peak of Normal"
