= Full Circle (Holger Czukay, Jah Wobble and Jaki Liebezeit album) =

Studio album by Holger Czukay, Jah Wobble and Jaki Liebezeit
- Released: 1982
- Studio: Inner Space Studio, Cologne, Germany
- Genre: Krautrock, dub
- Length: 40:40
- Label: Virgin

Holger Czukay chronology
On the Way to the Peak of Normal (1981)	Full Circle (1982)	Snake Charmer (1983)

Professional ratings
Review scores
Source	Rating
Allmusic	2/5 stars

Full Circle is a collaborative album between musicians Holger Czukay, Jah Wobble and Jaki Liebezeit, released in 1982 through Virgin Records.

== Track listing ==
Side one
No.	Title	Writer(s)	Length
1.	"How Much Are They?"	Czukay, Wobble	4:48
2.	"Where's the Money?"	Czukay, Wobble	5:02
3.	"Full Circle R.P.S. (No. 7)"	Czukay, Liebezeit, Wobble	10:58

Side two
No.	Title	Writer(s)	Length
1.	"Mystery R.P.S. (No. 8)"	Czukay, Liebezeit, Wobble	8:47
2.	"Trench Warfare"	Czukay, Wobble	6:45
3.	"Twilight World"	Czukay, Wobble	4:20

== Personnel ==
Musicians

- Holger Czukay – guitar, organ, piano, French horn, percussion, engineering, mixing, drum machine on "How Much Are They?", vocals on "Full Circle R.P.S. (No. 7)"
- Jaki Liebezeit – drums, percussion, trumpet and backing vocals on "Full Circle R.P.S. (No. 7)"
- Jah Wobble – bass guitar, vocals, synthesizer on "How Much Are They?"

Production and additional personnel

- Mark Angelo Lusardi – mixing and recording on "How Much Are They?"
- René Tinner – recording
