= Good Morning Story =

Studio album by Holger Czukay
- Released: 1999
- Genre: Krautrock
- Length: 46:31
- Label: Tone Casualties
- Producer: Holger Czukay

Holger Czukay chronology
Clash (1997)	Good Morning Story (1999)	La Luna (2000)

Professional ratings
Review scores
Source	Rating
Allmusic	4/5 stars

Good Morning Story is the eighth album by Holger Czukay, released in 1999 through Tone Casualties.

== Track listing ==
All tracks are written by Holger Czukay

No.	Title	Length
1.	"Invisible Man"	4:55
2.	"Good Morning Story"	3:52
3.	"Dancing in Wild Circles"	5:27
4.	"World of the Universe"	3:23
5.	"Atlantis"	6:19
6.	"Mirage"	22:35

== Personnel ==
- Holger Czukay – vocals, guitar, bass guitar, sampler, synthesizer, production
- Ursula Kloss – design, illustrations
- U-She – vocals
