= Movie (disambiguation) =

A movie or film is a work of visual art.

Movie, Movies, The Movie, or The Movies may also refer to:

== Films ==
- Feature film
- Film adaptation
- A Movie (1958), an experimental film
- Movies@, a cinema chain in the Republic of Ireland
- The Movie (2022 film), an American comedy horror film
- The Movie (2023 film), a Mexican comedy film
- The Movies (film), a 1925 silent film directed by Fatty Arbuckle

== Music ==
=== Performers ===
- The Movies (band), a British band, or their self-titled album
- Tribes of the City, formerly The Movies, a Latvian post-rock band

=== Albums ===
- Movie (Mod Sun album), 2017
- Movies (Franco Ambrosetti album), 1987
- Movies (Holger Czukay album), 1979
- Movies (Michael Mantler album), 1978
- The Movies (Maksim Mrvica album), 2012
- A Movie (Film By Kelly Chen), by Kelly Chen (1997)

=== Songs ===
- "Movies" (Alien Ant Farm song), from Anthology, 2001
- "Movies" (Circa Waves song), from What's It Like Over There?, 2018
- "Movie", by Megan Thee Stallion featuring Lil Durk from Good News, 2020
- "Movies", by Weyes Blood from Titanic Rising, 2019
- "The Movie", by Aerosmith from Permanent Vacation, 1987
- "The Movie", by the Doors from An American Prayer, 1978
- "The Movies", by The Statler Brothers from The Country America Loves, 1977

== Television ==
- Movies!, an American digital multicast television network that broadcasts feature films
- "Movie" (Not Going Out), a 2011 episode
- "The Movie" (Seinfeld), a 1993 episode
- The Movies (miniseries), a 2019 series on the history of American movies and their effects on American society
- "The Movies" (The Goodies), a 1975 episode

== Video games ==
- Movie (video game), a 1986 computer game by Imagine Software
- The Movies (video game), a 2005 simulation computer game
