= Clash (Holger Czukay and Dr. Walker album) =

Studio album by Holger Czukay vs. Dr. Walker
- Released: 1997
- Genres: Ambient techno, experimental
- Length: 144:22
- Label: Sideburn Recordings

Holger Czukay chronology
Moving Pictures (1993)	Clash (1997)	Good Morning Story (1999)

Professional ratings
Review scores
Source	Rating
Allmusic	4/5 stars

Clash is a collaborative album between Holger Czukay and Dr. Walker, released in 1997 through Sideburn Recordings.

== Track listing ==
Disc one
No.	Title	Length
1.	"Silent Planes"	19:35
2.	"Liquid Skies"	13:34
3.	"The Wonderful World of Screeches, Racing Cars and Crybats"	12:39
4.	"Chicago, Pt. 1"	13:42
5.	"Backup Dream"	7:48

Disc two
No.	Title	Length
1.	"Chicago, Pt. 2"	11:01
2.	"Anything But the Jungle"	20:27
3.	"Dawn Across the Street"	20:53
4.	"Full Circle"	9:20
5.	"Monks, Whales and Moonbeams"	11:40

== Personnel ==
- Holger Czukay – sampler, engineering, mastering
- Ursula Kloss – design, illustrations
- Ingmar Koch (as Dr. Walker) – sampler, Roland TR-808, mixing
