= Plight & Premonition =

Studio album by David Sylvian and Holger Czukay
- Released: 21 March 1988
- Recorded: 1986–1987
- Studio: Can Studio, Cologne
- Genre: Avant-garde, ambient
- Length: 34:51
- Label: Venture
- Producer: David Sylvian, Holger Czukay

David Sylvian chronology
Secrets of the Beehive (1987)	Plight & Premonition (1988)	Flux + Mutability (1989)

Holger Czukay chronology
Rome Remains Rome (1987)	Plight & Premonition (1988)	Flux + Mutability (1989)

Professional ratings
Review scores
Source	Rating
AllMusic	4/5 stars
Encyclopedia of Popular Music	3/5 stars

Plight & Premonition is the first of two collaborative albums by English musician David Sylvian and German musician Holger Czukay. It was released in March 1988. The music on Plight & Premonition is ambient, making extensive use of found sounds from a variety of non-traditional sources. It consists of two instrumental tracks, both of which are over 15 minutes long. The album peaked at No. 71 in the UK albums chart.

== Background ==
Czukay had come to prominence in the 1960s with the experimental rock group Can, while Sylvian was the former frontman of the UK new wave group Japan before embarking on a solo career.

== Recording ==
Although the album was recorded late in 1986, Sylvian and Czukay completed Premonition together quite soon after the session in February 1987. The compositions were not released until March 1988 by the low-budget subsidiary of Virgin that specialised in experimental compositions, Venture Records.

The tracks were later remixed by Sylvian and issued on a limited bonus disc with his 2002 compilation album Camphor. These remixes were used for a 2018 re-release by Grönland Records of a double album set combining this album and Flux + Mutability, their subsequent 1989 release.

Sylvian said about the album 2012:

"We didn't plan to make an album together. Holger Czukay actually invited me to Cologne to put a vocal on a track for an album that he was recording. And the first night that I arrived it was late in the evening. He suggested we have dinner, and we came back to the studio and I just sat down and started playing. And I just walked around the room from instrument to instrument and I wasn't always aware of what he was recording, and that's really the way that he likes it.

As soon as the performance became too self-conscious, he'd wait for me to start up with something else. It was created over a period of, I think, two nights, possibly three. I never got to record the vocal for him because it was time for me to leave at the end of that period, but we'd come up with something far more interesting, I think, in the process."

== Track listing ==
1. "Plight (The Spiralling of Winter Ghosts)" – 18:30
2. "Premonition (Giant Empty Iron Vessel)" – 16:21

== Personnel ==
- David Sylvian – electric guitar, keyboards, piano, vibraphone, harmonium
- Holger Czukay – organ, piano, shortwave radio, treatments
- Jaki Liebezeit – infra sound
- Karl Lippegaus – radio tuning

Album produced by David Sylvian and Holger Czukay.

- Yuka Fujii – design, photography (assisted by Icon, London)
- Mekon – artwork
