= Canaxis 5 =

1969 studio album by Technical Space Composer's Crew (Holger Czukay & Rolf Dammers)

Studio album by Technical Space Composer's Crew (Holger Czukay & Rolf Dammers)
- Released: 1969
- Recorded: 1968
- Studio: Studio für Elektronische Musik, (Cologne, Germany)
- Genre: Sound collage; musique concrète; experimental; electroacoustic; tape music
- Length: 37:54
- Label: Music Factory
- Producer: Holger Czukay; Rolf Dammers (co-producer)

Holger Czukay chronology
Canaxis 5 (1969)	Movies (1979)

Canaxis 5 (or simply Canaxis) is the only studio album by the Technical Space Composer's Crew, released in 1969 by Music Factory. On later issues, the artist credit was changed to Holger Czukay and Rolf Dammers. The album was remixed for Spoon Records releases and again for the Revisited Rec. release.

Mark Prendergast of Record Collector describes it as "an experimental album of taped sound collages, mixing various field recordings with electronic tones", a direction he noticed Czukay digressed from to be bassist with Can.

== Recording and release ==
Holger Czukay and Rolf Dammers, a painter and writer, met at the boarding school in St. Gallen, Switzerland. They recorded Canaxis in 1968, a few months after the foundation of Holger's project "Can". Before the actual recording took place, the pair had tried out a method of combining sounds at home, using three tape machines and a five-track mixer. Czukay said of the process : "Recordings were monaural and were made in the West German radio station at night when nobody was there. ... I can admit that I took the key without permission and went into Stockhausen's studio after he had left, to work through the night on my music. I really couldn't have done my composing any other way at the time. The basic equipment consisted of three tape recorders that were used to record sounds and tape loops from which two or three layers were built up." Canaxis was created for the small German label Music Factory, and according to the musician, sold well.

== Music ==
Music and Musicians wrote that Canaxis 5 is the result of a collaboration between Rolf Dammers and Holger Czukay, a latter of whom was raised from Stockhausen traditions and worked with found sounds and musique concrète, and experimenting with "tape segments and multiple editing" based on the concepts of Pierre Henry and Pierre Schaeffer, "credited with its invention in Paris during the late 40s."

Czukay said he created the album by taking music from around the world, including Africa, Asia, Australia and Vietnam, using the radio to collect many of the extracts, and then "mixed the completed tape recordings with European music, e.g. choral music using tape loops. "Boat Woman Song" contains samples from a shortwave radio recording of the traditional love song "Doh Dam Tara", performed by members of the Cham culture, who primarily live in Cambodia and Vietnam. It was inadvertently credited as a completely different ethnic Vietnamese song, "Hò Mái Nhì", when the album was initially released.

== Critical reception and legacy ==
Professional ratings
Review scores
Source	Rating
Allmusic	2.5/5 stars

In December 1972, New Musical Express published the third instalment of Ian MacDonald's "Krautrock: Germany Calling" feature on the birth of krautrock, in which MacDonald reviewed several "late arrivals" including Canaxis 5, which he identified as an "Inner Special Production". He wrote: "It features Roland Dammers and Can's Holger Czukay playing with loops, electronics, and field-recordings of Vietnamese peasant-songs – which could have been very interesting but, through self-indulgence, isn't." In his review for AllMusic, Ted Mills described the music as "a hybrid of ambient soundspaces, musicological sampling, and a sort of Steve Reich-like loop system."

Can biographers Rob Young and Irmin Schmidt deemed Canaxis 5 to be "one of the great crossover works of the sixties, an electroacoustic tape piece created in do-it-yourself circumstances." They added that it is sometimes credited as "the origin of sampling of music," and while they added that this is not strictly true, the album "nevertheless adeptly dovetails the parallel disciplines of loop-based minimalism, superimposition and cultural appropriation, a picking from the 'exotic' Far East that is firmly rooted in the horrors of the Western war being waged there. It is, therefore, a non-academic piece of concrete tape music that plays directly to the counter-cultural political concerns."

== Track listing ==
Both pieces composed by Holger Czukay.

Side one
No.	Title	Length
1.	"Boat-Woman-Song"	17:39

Side two
No.	Title	Length
1.	"Canaxis"	20:15

== Personnel ==
Adapted from Canaxis 5 liner notes.

Technical Space Composer's Crew

- Holger Czukay – tape, production, engineering (also shortwave radio)
- Rolf Dammers – co-producer

== Release history ==
Region	Date	Label	Format	Catalog
Germany	1969	Music Factory	LP	SRS 002
Germany	1982	Spoon	LP	SPOON 015
United States	1995	Spoon	CD	SPOON 015
Germany	2006	Revisited Rec.	CD	REV 063
