= Snake Charmer (EP) =

EP by Jah Wobble, The Edge and Holger Czukay
- Released: October 1983
- Studios: The Fallout Shelter, London
- Genre: Post-punk
- Length: 31:15
- Label: Island
- Producers: François Kevorkian, Paul "Groucho" Smykle

Jah Wobble chronology
Bedroom Album (1983)	Snake Charmer (1983)	Neon Moon (1985)

Holger Czukay chronology
Full Circle (1982)	Snake Charmer (1983)	Der Osten ist Rot (1984)

Professional ratings
Review scores
Source	Rating
Allmusic	2/5 stars

Snake Charmer is a collaborative EP between musicians Jah Wobble, The Edge and Holger Czukay released in 1983 through Island Records.

== Track listing ==
Side one
No.	Title	Writer(s)	Length
1.	"Snake Charmer"	Holger Czukay, François Kevorkian, Ollie Marland, Jah Wobble	6:12
2.	"Hold on to Your Dreams"	The Edge, François Kevorkian, Ollie Marland, Arthur Russell, Jah Wobble	8:38

Side two
No.	Title	Writer(s)	Length
1.	"It Was a Camel"	Holger Czukay, Jaki Liebezeit, Ollie Marland, Neville Murray, Wobble	5:45
2.	"Sleazy"	Dave "Animal" Maltby, Jim Walker, Jah Wobble	3:46
3.	"Snake Charmer" (Reprise)	Holger Czukay, François Kevorkian, Ollie Marland, Jah Wobble	6:54

== Personnel ==
Musicians

- Holger Czukay – guitar, grand piano, French horn
- The Edge – guitar
- Ollie Marland – keyboards
- Neville Murray – percussion
- Jah Wobble – bass guitar, vocals

Additional musicians and production

- Marcella Allen – vocals on "Hold on to Your Dreams"
- Dave "Animal" Maltby – guitar on "Snake Charmer" and "Sleazy"
- François Kevorkian – production, drum programming on "Snake Charmer", synthesizer on "It Was a Camel"
- Jaki Liebezeit – drums on "Hold on to Your Dreams"
- Ben Mandelson – guitar on "It Was a Camel"
- Herb Powers Jr. – mastering
- Paul "Groucho" Smykle – production, engineering
- Stephen Street – engineering
- Bruno Tilley – art direction
- Jim Walker – drums on "Sleazy"
- Paul Wearing – illustrations
