= Phew (album) =

Studio album by Phew
- Released: 1981
- Studio: Conny Plank's studio
- Length: 32:43
- Label: Pass
- Producers: Phew; Conny Plank; Holger Czukay; Jaki Liebezeit; Yoshitaka Goto

Phew chronology
| Phew (1981) | View (1987) |

Phew is the debut studio album by Japanese musician Hiromi Moritani under the pseudonym Phew. It was released in 1981 through Pass Records.

== Background ==
Hiromi Moritani, better known as Phew, is a Japanese musician from Osaka. She was a member of the band Aunt Sally. In 1980, she released her debut solo single, "Finale" / "Urahara", produced by Ryuichi Sakamoto. Phew is her debut solo album. It was recorded at Conny Plank's studio in Germany, with contributions from Can's Holger Czukay and Jaki Liebezeit.

The album was released in 1981 through Pass Records.

== Critical reception ==
Professional ratings
Review scores
| Source | Rating |
|---|---|
| AllMusic | 4.5/5 stars |

Chris May of The Vinyl Factory commented that Phew "comes over like a Japanese incarnation of Nico, deadpan but with greater vocal range." He added, "Most of the tracks are short and their mood varies, but Phew hangs together beautifully." Jennifer Lucy Allan of The Quietus stated, "There is an immaculate architecture between her vocals and [Liebezeit's] percussion that feels like it's being erected in real time in front of your ears: chug – snap – utterance, like musical Meccano." JT Lindroos of AllMusic noted that "it has the earmarks of an album Can could have made, had they taken a different path after Ege Bamyasi." J Monk of Tiny Mix Tapes wrote, "Most often she carries an incredibly strong debut as an equal partner with her heavy lifting companions, who leave us with another compelling artifact of the brilliant drum and electronic experiments that German music provided in the 70s and 80s."

== Track listing ==
All tracks are written by Phew, Conny Plank, Holger Czukay, and Jaki Liebezeit.

Phew track listing
| No. | Title | Length |
|---|---|---|
| 1. | "Closed" | 3:17 |
| 2. | "Signal" | 4:28 |
| 3. | "Doze" | 5:17 |
| 4. | "Dream" | 3:20 |
| 5. | "Mapping" | 3:45 |
| 6. | "Aqua" | 3:51 |
| 7. | "P-Adic" | 3:33 |
| 8. | "Fragment" | 3:58 |
| 9. | "Circuit" | 1:38 |
| Total length: | | 32:43 |

== Personnel ==
Credits adapted from liner notes.

- Phew – production
- Conny Plank – production, engineering, editing
- Holger Czukay – production, editing
- Jaki Liebezeit – production
- Yoshitaka Goto – production
- Shinichi Tanaka – additional mixing (4, 6)
- Hiroya Kaji – photography
- Takanobu Morinaga – design
- Kyohei Kusakari – design
