= The Ratastrophe Catastrophe =

2003 fantasy comedy novel

- Author: David Lee Stone
- Genre: Fantasy comedy
- Publisher: Hodder Children's Books
- Publication date: 6 December 2003
- ISBN: 978-0340873427

The Ratastrophe Catastrophe is a children's fantasy comedy novel written by David Lee Stone, released in June 2003. It is the first novel in The Illmoor Chronicles, a six-book series set in the fictional continent of Illmoor. It was first published in the United Kingdom by Hodder Children's Books before receiving a North American edition from Hyperion Books for Children in 2004.

== Plot ==
The Ratastrophe Catastrophe is the first book The Illmoor Chronicles. In the book, a simple young boy named Diek Wustapha, who becomes possessed by dark magic early in the story and finds that he has the power to charm people and animals alike with the tune of his flute. Soon becoming bored of his life in the town of Little Irkesome, Diek journeys around Illmoor, looking for a use for his newly acquired talents.

In Dullitch, capital city of Illmoor, the current ruler, Duke Modeset, is facing a severe problem. The city is infested with rats, large rats, and lots of them, too. The resident rat-catchers have long since given up, and the situation is grave. The chairman of the Dullitch Council, Tambor Forestall, who was a wizard before he gave up magic for politics when sorcery was outlawed on Illmoor long ago, has sent heralds to hire mercenaries to solve the Dullitch rat infestation.

One of the heralds, young Jimmy Quickstint, grandson of Tambor, who only works as a herald part-time; he is actually a trainee member of the Rooftop Runners, a group of organised thieves in Dullitch, finds the barbarian mercenaries Groan Teethgrit, the giant, bald mountain of muscle, and Gordo Goldeaxe, a one-eyed dwarf equipped with a lethal axe and an even deadlier supply of sarcasm. After being informed that all the other mercenaries on the list are dead or dismembered, Jimmy heads back to Dullitch with the intrepid barbarian pair, who completely fail to solve the rat problem.

Meanwhile, another herald stumbles upon Diek in the town of Crust, and promptly puts his name on the list and brings him back to Dullitch. Once there, Diek convinces Duke Modeset that he is able to get rid of the rat infestation for a price far lower than what the Duke was planning to pay the barbarians.

Parodying the Pied Piper, Diek charms the rats with his flute and leads them to a nearby jetty and drowns them all. As he goes to collect his reward from the Duke, he finds that the Dullitch Treasury lacks the funds to pay him. Enraged, he leaves the Treasury and is convinced by a voice in his head- the magic possessing him– that he should have his revenge on all of Dullitch. He then charms the city's children in the same way.

The citizens of Dullitch, bewildered at the sudden disappearance of the children of the city, decide that Duke Modeset is a good scapegoat. They surround the palace, trapping him inside, but not before he gives Jimmy Quickstint a couple of hundred crowns down-payment to give to the barbarian mercenaries, as well as Tambor, who has joined the pair and returned to his sorcerer roots, to bring the children of Dullitch back and kill Diek. Unfortunately, the horse Jimmy is riding runs off with the money and he is stuck in the middle of the Carafat Jungles, but soon finds a secret entrance to the catacombs of the mountains known as the Twelve, where he meets a stranger named Stump, who claims to have seen Diek come into the catacombs with the children.

Jimmy and Stump travel further into the Twelve, where they meet Tambor, Groan and Gordo, who have also found their way into the Twelve as they were held prisoner by an angry giant. The group, motivated by the prospect of saving the children of Dullitch from Diek, as well as by the prospect of money, decide to attack Diek, whose mind has been totally consumed by dark magic, when they find him deep in the Twelve.

In the battle that follows, Tambor opens a portal known as the Doorway of Death, a way into the limbo, as Groan distracts Diek. Unfortunately, Diek manages to push Tambor into his own Doorway, and as a furious Groan hurls Diek bodily into the portal, the Doorway of Death closes, sealing their fates. Meanwhile, as Jimmy and Gordo manage to free the children from their prison, Stump falls into a hole and disappears.

The remaining three lead the children safely back to Dullitch, where they are rewarded in separate ways. Groan and Gordo are drugged and thrown into jail, and Jimmy is kicked out of the Rooftop Runners for being brave and honourable. Duke Modeset is exiled from Dullitch, and his cousin, Viscount Raviss Curfew, is to be the next lord of Dullitch.

== Reception ==
Critical reception was mixed. Publishers Weekly described the novel as a humorous reworking of the Pied Piper legend, praising its premise while criticising its character development. Kirkus Reviews gave a more favourable assessment, describing it as "a delightfully nasty Pied Piper retold in the style of Terry Pratchett" and praising its comic fantasy elements.

== Series ==
The Ratastrophe Catastrophe is the first novel in The Illmoor Chronicles, a six-book fantasy series by David Lee Stone. It introduces the fictional city of Illmoor and many of the characters, settings, and themes that recur throughout the series.

The book was followed by The Yowler Foul-Up (2004), The Shadewell Shenanigans (2005), The Dwellings Debacle (2006), The Vanquish Vendetta (2006), and The Coldstone Conflict (2007).
