= Kitbuilders =

Kitbuilders are an electro-duo (singer Ripley, keyboardist Benway) from Cologne, Germany. Their style is a mixture of Electro, New Wave and IDM. Benway played in the Band "Les Immer Essen" (together with Joerg Burger; signed to EMI) before he founded Kitbuilders in 1997 with Ripley. They are influenced by bands like Suicide and Chris & Cosey. Kitbuilders (and acts like ADULT.) pioneered the Electroclash/ Electropunk-movement. Kitbuilders released on labels like Electrecord, World Electric, Ersatz Audio (the label of ADULT.) Television, Breakin´ Records (the label of DMX Krew), Vertical, Art Of Perception, Play It Again Sam many more. Kitbuilders received Radio airplay from DJs like Dave Clarke, Laurent Garnier, DJ Hell, Larry Tee, John Peel, Andrew Weatherall (they were signed to his agency Haywire) and others. Kitbuilders worked with artist Eric Parnes (music for an installation in New York) and contributed a track to the soundtrack of the Loveparade-movie Be Angeled.The Kitbuilders album “You Trashed My Tracks” (2013, Vertical / Kompakt) features remixes by Terrence Dixon, Bolz Bolz, Bob Humid, Ascii Disko, Falko Brocksieper, Keith Tenniswood aka Radioactive Man, Salz and others. In 2020 they contributed to the Carebots compilation (Bass Agenda Recordings). Kitbuilders played gigs in London, New York, San Francisco, Oslo, Berlin, Madrid, Brussels, Helsinki, Istanbul, Tel Aviv and on Festivals like Roskilde-Festival, Sónar, Arvika, Benicassim, Fusion Festival, Eurosonic, Dedbeat Weekender and in clubs like Tresor, Fabric (they also contributed a track for the Fabric 8 compilation), Distillery, The Egg and many more.

== Remixes ==
In addition to their own material Kitbuilders produced Remixes for artists like Man Parrish / Lectronix, Radioactive Man / Keith Tenniswood, Warren Suicide, Christian Morgenstern, Sold Out and many more.

== Compilations ==
Their tracks have appeared on Compilations by BMG, K7 and many other labels worldwide.

== Discography (selection) ==
- Wake Up (World Electric / Intergroove)* Girls On Stage (Electrecord)
- Stupid Games (Electrochord)
- Collaboration EP (with Bolz Bolz, World Electric)
- Rebuild (Vertical)
- Bad Girl (Breakin´Records)
- Slyder (World Electric)
- In The Year 2525 (Television)
- Wake Up Remixes (World Electric)
- Space Marines (with John Starlight /Art Of Perception)
- 2011: You Trashed My Mind(Day Glo/Vertical)
- 2013: You Trashed My Tracks (Vertical)
- 2019: Reality (Vertical/Kompakt)
