= Flux + Mutability =

Studio album by David Sylvian and Holger Czukay
- Released: 4 September 1989
- Recorded: December 1988
- Studio: Inner Space Studio, Cologne
- Genre: Ambient
- Length: 37:55
- Label: Venture, Virgin
- Producer: David Sylvian, Holger Czukay

David Sylvian chronology
Plight and Premonition (1988)	Flux + Mutability (1989)	Weatherbox (1989)

Holger Czukay chronology
Plight & Premonition (1988)	Flux + Mutability (1989)	Radio Wave Surfer (1991)

Professional ratings
Review scores
Source	Rating
AllMusic	4/5 stars
The Encyclopedia of Popular Music	3/5 stars
MusicHound Rock: The Essential Album Guide	2/5 stars
The Rolling Stone Album Guide	2/5 stars

Flux + Mutability is the second collaboration between David Sylvian and Holger Czukay. It was released in September 1989. The music consists of two instrumental tracks improvised by the participants.

The album was reissued by Gronland in 2018.

== Production ==
The album was recorded at Can's Inner Space Studio.

== Critical reception ==
Reviewing the reissue package, Pitchfork wrote that "Czukay’s side is the more active of the two. Driven by a small drum pattern played by Can percussionist Jaki Liebezeit, the piece is evocatively subtitled 'A Big, Bright, Colourful World'. Its light synth drones and radio noise are illuminated by the lens flares of Markus Stockhausen’s flugelhorn and then slightly darkened by some fragmented guitar figures added by another Can member, Michael Karoli." The Rolling Stone Album Guide opined that Flux was the more interesting of the two Czukay/Sylvian collaborations, but wrote that "why anyone would bother making such a distinction is hard to say, given the generally vacuous nature of the music." Fact wrote that "while Plight & Premonition felt like a study in unease, wracked with paranoia, Flux + Mutability admits the possibility, if not any certainty, of earthly bliss."

== Track listing ==
1. "Flux (A Big, Bright, Colourful World)" (Sylvian, Czukay) – 16:56
2. "Mutability (A New Beginning Is in the Offing)" (Sylvian, Czukay) – 20:59

== Personnel ==
- Holger Czukay – electric guitar (1), bass guitar (1), dictaphone (1), radio (1), engineer
- David Sylvian – guitar (1, 2), keyboard instruments (1, 2), art director
- Michael Karoli – electric guitar (1)
- Michi - voice (1)
- Markus Stockhausen – flugelhorn (1)
- Jaki Liebezeit – percussion (1), African flute (2)

=== Additional personnel ===
- René Tinner - technical advice and assistant
- Yuka Fujii - art director, cover art, photography design
- David Buckland - front cover photography

Published by Opium (Arts) Ltd./Spoon Music
