= Rome Remains Rome =

Studio album by Holger Czukay
- Released: 1987
- Studio: Can Studio, Cologne, Germany
- Genre: Krautrock
- Length: 39:05
- Label: Virgin
- Producer: Holger Czukay

Holger Czukay chronology
Der Osten ist Rot (1984)	Rome Remains Rome (1987)	Plight & Premonition (1988)

Professional ratings
Review scores
Source	Rating
Allmusic	4.5/5 stars

Rome Remains Rome is the fifth album by Holger Czukay, released in 1987 through Virgin Records. One single was released, Blessed Easter, which samples Pope John Paul II's Easter message.

== Track listing ==
Side one
No.	Title	Lyrics	Music	Length
1.	"Hey Baba Reebop"		Czukay	3:53
2.	"Blessed Easter"		Czukay, Liebezeit, Marland, Wobble	8:51
3.	"Sudetenland"	Czukay, Wobble	Czukay, Liebezeit, Wobble	7:22

Side two
No.	Title	Lyrics	Music	Length
1.	"Hit Hit Flop Flop"	Ancel, Czukay	Czukay	3:34
2.	"Perfect World"	Ancel, Czukay	Czukay	10:33
3.	"Music in the Air"		Czukay	5:13

== Personnel ==
Musicians

- Sheldon Ancel – vocals
- Holger Czukay – vocals, guitar, organ, bass guitar, French horn, synthesizer, production, recording
- Michael Karoli – guitar
- Jaki Liebezeit – drums, trumpet, piano, percussion
- Ollie Marland – guitar, piano
- Jah Wobble – bass guitar, vocals
- Dirk Giehmann, Peter Cremer – children's vocals ("Hit Hit Flop Flop")

Production and additional personnel

- Cecilia De Medeiros – design
- René Tinner – recording
