= Bob Humid =

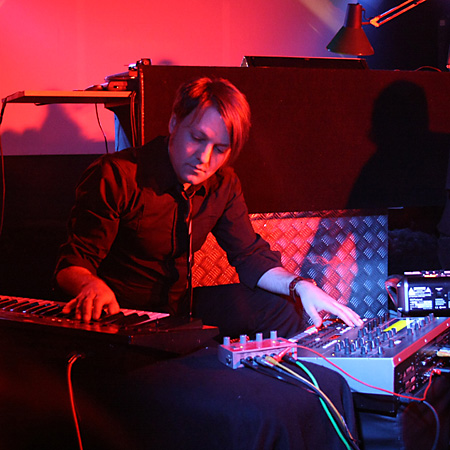

Background information
- Also known as: Robert Edwin
- Born: Robert Edwin Feuchtl Mato
- Origin: Cologne, West Germany
- Genres: Electronica; Drum'n'Bass; Dance music Breakbeat
- Years active: 1989–2020
- Labels: Serve & Destroy, Big Noise Records, Dion Fortune Records, Bored Beyond Belief Records, Ware Records
- Website: bobhumid.de

Bob Humid (also known as Robert Feuchtl) is a German producer, DJ, sound designer and mastering engineer in the Cologne electronic music and studio scene. His musical work expands from electronic breakbeats to experimental electronica while occasionally touching the area of club music and pop. He describes his own music as "eclectica".

He was born in Montevideo, Uruguay, but grew up primarily in Germany. He was one third of the electronic body music / synthpop formation "Der Liederkranz" in the late 1980s and early 1990s. He has organised and co-organised many activities in Cologne's electronic music underground including "Mos Eisley" (with DJ Tetsuo), "Twist'n'Shout" (with Uh-Young Kim), "Is It Now?", "Radical Love Area", "Vectrax" (with Telekolleck), "Propellor Knights", "Lights! Lights!" and "BASScadets" (with Snork and Dan_K). He has also run the two record labels named Bored Beyond Belief (1995–along with Wolfgang Schreck from Big Noise fame) and Serve & Destroy Recordings, the latter being his own label platform. He is described as one of the resident DJs of "Ehrenfeld Calling", a Cologne-based monthly event featuring both breakbeat and techno-oriented music.

Bob Humid was the technical editor for the German Groove Magazine, succeeding Christian Rindermann (aka C-Rock). He also worked as a technical writer for the German magazines Keyboards and Sound & Recording. Along testing studio and DJ gear he is a producer with an affinity for detail. Over the years he has gained a growing reputation as a dedicated mastering engineer. Under the credit of his own studio "Fat of Excellence", which he runs together with Numinos, he mastered countless records for Boxer Sport, Mathias Schaffhaeuser's Ware Records, Pagoda London, Plasteline, Audiolith, Patrick Alavi, Kitbuilders, Dan Curtin, Plemo, Der Tante Renate, Bratze and many other independent labels and artists. His work also includes sound design for various companies such as Native Instruments, Magix (Samplitude, Sequoia) and U-He (Satin). His more recent works are productions for the highly acclaimed Leipzig-based band Brockdorff Klang Labor for whom he produced half of the tracks of the album "Die Fälschung der Welt", along with one of Germany's most known producers for alternative music, Tobias Levin.

Over the time, Bob Humid has worked, produced, and remixed with such people and groups as: twila.too, Carla Subito (Fetisch Park), Holger Czukay (Can), Fabian Stall (Zero Cash), Oliver Twist Kooperationen, Brockdorff Klanglabor, Igor Sirodzha, Daniel Myer (Dots And Dashes, Haujobb), Bernhard Deissler (Videos), Alexander Gerdes, Numinos, Coloma, Mathew Mercer, Carlsbop, Der Liederkranz, Decomposed Subsonic (aka Valour), Uh-Young Kim, Telekolleck (British Botschaft), Peter Licht, Djamel Laroussi and Mathias Schaffhäuser (Ware Records).

== Album releases ==
Twisted Repairs (Serve & Destroy / Groove Attack) – 2001

His debut twin-album release Twisted Repairs (see also "Twisted Despairs") draws a sharp line between the musical styles of labels such as Rephlex and Certificate 18. It features elements of IDM, Techstep, Drum'n'Bass and some vocal production. It also features sophisticated beat-programming and a unique editing where every sound has a meaningful feel to it. Bob Humid has an obsession for Funk within 4/4th metrics and a digital production philosophy that he claims to be influenced a lot by Rupert Hine in his early 1980s phase. It can be noted that it is one of the first electronic works that feature object-oriented editing, a feature only available in the Digital Audio Workstation Samplitude back in 2001. While being distributed worldwide by Groove Attack, both debut albums have been solely promoted in Germany, where they have been highly acclaimed by the local press.

Twisted Despairs (Serve & Destroy / Groove Attack) – 2001

Twisted Despairs was released in 2001 as a companion album to Twisted Repairs. It presents an experimental reinterpretation of the earlier album, incorporating elements of breakbeat, drum and bass and electronic music. Humid described the concept as imagining how the original recordings might sound if remixed in the distant future. The album features extensive electronic sound processing and experimentation.

Second Wind Phenomenon (Suburban Trash / Serve & Destroy) – 2006

Five years after his debut album "Twisted Repairs", Humid released "Second Wind Phenomenon", which combines elements of soundtrack, science fiction, psychedelia, IDM, drill'n'bass and radioplays. A concept album inspired by artists like Godley & Creme, The Legendary Pink Dots or Coil (band), the album features vocal production techniques such as binaural microphoning. Collaborators include Holger Czukay (Can), Igor Sirodzha, Coloma, twila.too and Carla Subito (Fetisch Park). The CD Extra-Zone of the CD-version contains a XviD-version of "Angst", a 16mm short-movie by filmmaker Alexander Gerdes for whom Bob Humid has written the soundtrack and score. The idea of the album artwork was strongly inspired by the psychedelia art of Heinz Edelmann, who was responsible for the pop-art look in Yellow Submarine.

== Notes ==
Interview for his work as a sound-designer and sound-mixer in film for Magix Magazine [6]

Interview for the German Keyboards Magazine 09/2002 by Bernhard Loesner

Interview for FRIEDMYLITTLEBRAIN-Magazine in 2013 by Damian B
