= La Luna (Holger Czukay album) =

1999 album by Holger Czukay

Studio album by Holger Czukay
- Released: June 13, 2000
- Recorded: May 17, 1996
- Label: Revisited Rec.
- Producer: Holger Czukay

Holger Czukay chronology
Good Morning Story (1999)	La Luna (2000)	Linear City

Professional ratings
Review scores
Source	Rating
AllMusic	3/5 stars

La Luna is the ninth album by Holger Czukay, released on June 13, 2000. The album originally consisted of one extended work, "La Luna", recorded four years earlier and described as "an electronic night ceremony". According to Czukay,

It seems to me that certain types of albums almost create themselves. In such cases the composer is merely the conduit for a pre-existing energy waiting to be transformed into sound. My experience with La Luna was very much like that. The album […] is in many ways a product of something similar to the automatic writing techniques of the Surrealists. I had purchased a new sampler and began experimenting with the machine without reference to the instruction manual and filled the brain of the machine to its full capacity with 'sonic memories'. In the late hours of the evening the machine came to life and spoke! The recording you hear is the transcript of this transcendental conversation between man and machine.

In 2007 the album was reissued with a more elaborate CD cover design and included an additional shorter remix track.

== Track listing ==
1. "La Luna"
2. "La Lu Na" (bonus remix track on 2007 reissue)

== Personnel ==
- Holger Czukay — producer
- U-She – voice
- Michi – electronic voice (on "La Lu Na")
- Michael Karoli – bass (on "La Lu Na")
- Jaki Liebezeit – bass drum, percussion (on "La Lu Na")
- Conny Plank – EMU (on "La Lu Na")

Technical

- Ursula Kloss (U-She) – Illustration
- György B.P. Szabó (2000) – Design (2000)
- Thomas Ewerhard (2007) – Design (2007)
- Matthias Mineur – Liner notes (2007)
