= Whew =

Whew may refer to:

- Whew!, American game show
- WHEW-AM, American radio station
- WHEW-FM, American radio station now broadcasting as WWGR
