= Movies (Holger Czukay album) =

Studio album by Holger Czukay
- Released: 9 September 1979
- Recorded: January-July 1979
- Studios: Inner Space Studio, Cologne, Germany
- Genres: Experimental rock; art rock; electronic rock
- Length: 39:40 (vinyl edition); 44:41 (CD edition)
- Label: Electrola
- Producer: Holger Czukay

Holger Czukay chronology
Canaxis 5 (1969)	Movies (1979)	On the Way to the Peak of Normal (1981)

Movies is the second album by Holger Czukay, released in 1979 through Electrola.

Czukay's first solo album since leaving Can, the album combines electronic textures and tape loops influenced by the musique concrète work of avant-garde composer Karlheinz Stockhausen, and is an early experiment in sampling, "utilizing media samples accumulated over months of channel surfing and random radio listening" (the Iranian singer on "Persian Love", for instance, was found by chance on radio). Otherwise, the album combines bass and whispered vocal parts with layered synths and lilting African rhythms, the latter courtesy of percussionist Kwaku Baah, and the overall flow of the record is achieved by different segments being pieced into a unified whole.

== Critical reception ==
Professional ratings
Review scores
Source	Rating
AllMusic	3/5 stars
Pitchfork Media	8.0/10
Spin	9/10 stars
Uncut	4/5 stars

The Independent labeled the album a "cult classic," writing that "Czukay paved the way for later projects, such as David Byrne and Brian Eno's My Life in the Bush of Ghosts."

== Accolades ==
Year	Publication	Country	Accolade	Rank
1980	NME	United Kingdom	"Albums of the Year"	5
1985	Sounds	United Kingdom	"All Time Top 100 Albums"	98
2005	Robert Dimery	United States	"1001 Albums You Must Hear Before You Die"	*
"*" denotes an unordered list.

== Track listing ==
All tracks are written by Holger Czukay.

Side one
No.	Title	Length
1.	"Cool in the Pool"	4:48
2.	"Oh Lord, Give Us More Money"	13:18

Side two
No.	Title	Length
1.	"Persian Love"	6:20
2.	"Hollywood Symphony"	15:14

2006 CD reissue Bonus Tracks
No.	Title	Length
5.	"Cool in the Pool" (Instrumental)	4:57

== Personnel ==
- Rebop Kwaku Baah – organ on "Cool in the Pool"
- Holger Czukay – vocals, guitar, bass guitar, keyboards, synthesizer, production, engineering, mixing, recording
- Jaki Liebezeit – drums, congas
- Michael Karoli – guitar on "Oh Lord, Give Us More Money"
- Irmin Schmidt – grand piano on "Oh Lord, Give Us More Money"
