= Moving Pictures (Holger Czukay album) =

Studio album by Holger Czukay
- Released: 1993
- Genre: Electronic
- Length: 44:27
- Label: Mute
- Producer: Holger Czukay

Holger Czukay chronology
Radio Wave Surfer (1991)	Moving Pictures (1993)	Clash (1997)

Professional ratings
Review scores
Source	Rating
Allmusic	(not rated)

Moving Pictures is the seventh album by Holger Czukay, released in 1993 through Mute Records.

== Track listing ==
All music is composed by Holger Czukay.

No.	Title	Lyrics	Length
1.	"Longing for Daydreams"		5:20
2.	"All Night Long"	Czukay	4:57
3.	"Radio in an Hourglass"		5:55
4.	"Dark Moon"	Ancel, Czukay, U-She	4:46
5.	"Floatspace"		3:14
6.	"Rhythms of a Secret Life"	Ancel, Czukay	20:15

== Personnel ==
Musicians

- Sheldon Ancel – vocals on "All Night Long", "Dark Moon" and "Rhythms of a Secret Life"
- Holger Czukay – French horn, double bass, guitar, synthesizer, production, mixing, recording, vocals on "Radio in an Hourglass" and "Rhythms of a Secret Life"
- Romie Singh – vocals on "All Night Long" and "Rhythms of a Secret Life"
- U-She – vocals on "Longing for Daydreams", "Dark Moon"

Additional musicians and production

- Michael Karoli – guitar on "Rhythms of a Secret Life"
- Ursula Kloss – design, illustrations
- René Tinner – recording
- Jah Wobble – bass guitar on "Rhythms of a Secret Life"
- Helmut Zerlett – synthesizer on "Rhythms of a Secret Life"
