= Phew (singer) =

- Born: Hiromi Moritani; 12 September 1959 (age 67); Osaka, Japan
- Genres: Electropunk; avant-garde; experimental
- Occupations: Singer; composer
- Instruments: Vocals; electronics; synthesizer
- Years active: 1978–present
- Labels: Bereket; Mute; Pass; Alida; Mesh-Key; Felicity
- Formerly of: Aunt Sally; Big Picture; Most; Novo Tono; Radium Girls; I.P.Y.

Hiromi Moritani (born 12 September 1959), better known by her stage name Phew, is a Japanese singer and analogue electronics improviser working in the areas of experimental and avant-garde music.

== Early life ==
Hiromi Moritani was born on 12 September 1959 in Osaka, Japan. She became fascinated with punk music and flew to London in 1977 to see the Sex Pistols.

== Music career ==
Her career began as a member of post-punk group Aunt Sally, who released a self-titled album on Osaka's Vanity Records in 1979.

After the break-up of Aunt Sally, she released the "Finale"/"Urahara" single produced by composer Ryuichi Sakamoto, followed by the album Phew (1981) recorded at Conny Plank's studio in Cologne, with Holger Czukay and Jaki Liebezeit. This was followed by a series of albums that included Our Likeness (1992), recorded with Plank and Liebezeit, featuring Einstürzende Neubauten's Alexander Hacke and D.A.F./Liaisons Dangereuses' Chrislo Haas.

After 1995's Himitsu no Knife, she remained active in various groups, including the jam rock ensemble Novo Tono featuring Otomo Yoshihide, a collaboration with electronic musician Hiroyuki Nagashima called Big Picture, and the punk group Most with Boredoms guitarist Seiichi Yamamoto. In 2010, she returned to her solo career with the covers album Five Fingered Discount on her own Bereket label, featuring Jim O'Rourke.

From 2012, she began to work in electronic music and home recordings which gave rise to a prolific series of records, starting with 2015's A New World and continuing with 2017's Light Sleep and 2018's Voice Hardcore. In 2018, she also released Island, a collaboration with the Raincoats' Ana da Silva.

By the time of 2021's New Decade, she was receiving widespread acclaim for her long career in experimental music.

In 2026, she released Paper Masks, a collaborative album with Danielle de Picciotto.

== Discography ==
=== Solo albums ===
- Phew (Pass Records, 1981)
- View (Continental, 1987)
- Our Likeness (Mute, 1992)
- Himitsu no Knife (Alida, 1995)
- Five Finger Discount (Bereket, 2010)
- A New World (Felicity, 2015)
- Light Sleep (Mesh-Key, 2017)
- Voice Hardcore (Bereket, 2017)
- New Decade (Mute, 2021)

=== Collaborative albums ===
- The Absence of Time (with Blind Light; Alida, 1994)
- Panorama Paradise (with Novo Tono; Alida/Creativeman, 1996)
- Shiawase no Sumika (with Seiichi Yamamoto; Tokuma Japan Communications, 1998)
- Big Picture (with Hiroyuki Nagashima, as Big Picture; Little More, 2001)
- Most (with Most; P-Vine, 2001)
- Most Most (with Most; P-Vine, 2001)
- The Most Notorious (with Most; P-Vine, 2003)
- Dreamspeed/Blind Light 1992–1994 (with Anton Fier and Blind Light; Tzadik, 2003)
- Radium Girls 2011 (with Erika Kobayashi, as Project Undark; Bereket, 2012)
- Island (with Ana da Silva; Newwhere Music, 2018)
- Patience Soup (with Jim O'Rourke and Oren Ambarchi; Black Truffle, 2019)
- IPY (with Ikue Mori and YoshimiO, as I.P.Y.; Tzadik, 2020)
- IPY25 (with Ikue Mori and YoshimiO, as I.P.Y.; Tzadik, 2025)
- Paper Masks (with Danielle de Picciotto; Mute, 2026)

=== EPs ===
- Songs (Parco Sectary, 1991)
- Backfire of Joy (with John Duncan and Kondo Tatsuo; Black Truffle, 2021)

=== Singles ===
- "Finale" / "Urahara" (Pass Records, 1980)
- "Koyasan" (with The Unknown Cases; Fünfundvierzig, 2001)

=== Guest appearances ===
- Morio Agata – Norimono Zukan (Vanity, 1980)
- Anton Fier – Dreamspeed (Avant, 1993)
- Otomo Yoshihide – Otomo Yoshihide Plays the Music of Takeo Yamashita (P-Vine, 1999)
- Otomo Yoshihide's New Jazz Ensemble – Dreams (Tzadik, 2002)

=== Compilation appeararnces ===
- Rebel Incorporated (Wax, 1988)
- Megabank Presents Tribute to New Wave (Megabank, 1995)
- Mottomo Otomo – Unlimited XIII (Trost, 2000)
- Improvised Music from Japan (Improvised Music from Japan, 2001)
- Pass No Past (Pass/P-Vine, 2005)
