= Schloss Nörvenich =

Schloss near Cologne

Coordinates: 50°48′30″N 6°38′45″E

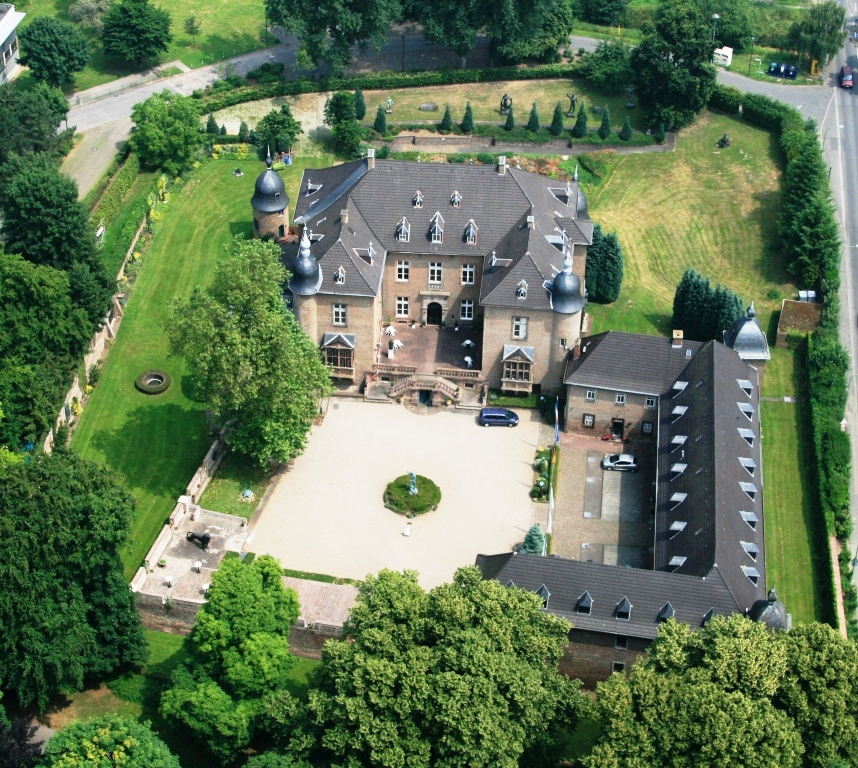
Schloss Nörvenich in 2009

Schloss Nörvenich is a schloss in Nörvenich, situated between Aachen and Cologne, Germany. In 21st century, Schloss Nörvenich has been hosting weddings and other events.

== History ==
Origin and early construction phase excavations by the Bonn State Museum in 1982 revealed that a smaller, demolished castle from the mid-14th century once stood at the current site. High medieval Pingsdorf pottery was recovered from a post pit. Two well fillings were excavated in the mansion cellar.

Schloss Nörvenich, formerly known as Gymnicher Burg, is located in Nörvenich, Düren district, North Rhine-Westphalia. It was established in around 1400 by bailiff Wilhelm von Vlatten. The castle was initially built as a two-part Wasserburg with the main structure and outer bailey facing south.

In the 15th century, the property fell through marriage to Konrad Scheiffart von Merode-Bornheim. Wilhelm Scheiffart von Merode and his wife Agnes von Bylandt enlarged the house in the middle of the 16th century to the West Wing. At the end of the 16th century, the castle fell through marriage to Baron Johann Otto von Gymnich, whose family remained in possession of it until the 19th century. It then passed to Count Wolff-Metternich von Gymnich, and became known for a period as Schloss Gymnich.

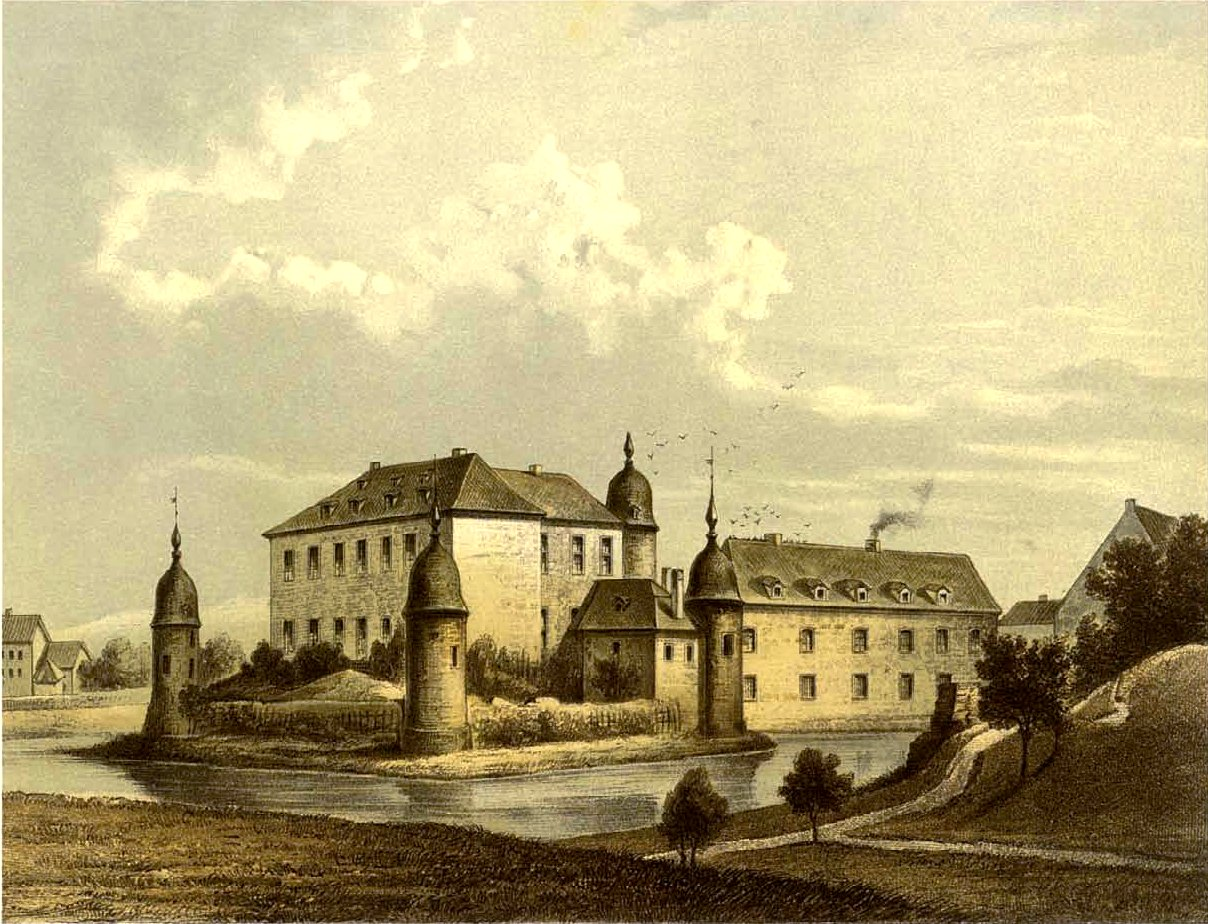
Schloss Nörvenich c. 1860

In the 18th century, it was expanded into a castle, and fortificated with a moat between the main and outer bailey. The outer trench zone, which was filled in 1902, has been dredged again by 1979 and used as a sculpture garden.

Just before the Second World War, the schloss was taken over by non-aristocratic owners, and since that time it has repeatedly changed hands.

By 1967 the castle was being rented by Christoph Vohwinkel, whose fortune came from the coal industry. Vohwinkel planned to renovate the castle and turn its spacious rooms into an art centre. The sculptor Ulrich Rückriem lived and worked here from 1963 to 1971. In early 1968, Can set up their own studio in the castle's upper hallway, which they called The Inner Space. The band recorded several albums, including Monster Movie, Soundtracks, and Tago Mago. They played noisy and chaotic music, which often disturbed other tenants, and by the end of 1971 the band decided to move out. The building now houses the Museum of European Art.

In 1982, the Landesmuseum Bonn excavated the site and unearthed the remains of an earlier fortress, measuring about 11 feet (3.4 m) by 25 feet (7.6 m) and dating to around 1350 plus medieval pottery. This earlier structure is believed to have been demolished down to the foundation in 1400 to enable the construction of a new, larger building. It was registered in the Nörvenich municipality's list of monuments under number "52" on 22 March 1985. In 1989, Minister-President Johannes Rau awarded the NRW Monument Plaque in recognition of the private reconstruction efforts "to preserve the cultural heritage in North Rhine-Westphalia".

The historic Nörvenich Castle has been the subject of repeated fine art since the 19th century. According to the archive inventory, these include depictions of the castle and its landscape by, among others, the following artists: Alexander Duncker (collector and publisher of lithographs, Berlin) 1890, Ernst Ohst, Rudolf Liefke (Düren), Jean Schmitz (Düren) 1985, Karl Herzog (Stuttgart) 1986, Paul Seimetz 1987, Siegfried Lunau (Düsseldorf) 1990, Birgit Sewekow 2005, Lajos Tar (Hungary), 2018.

From 1980 onwards, the castle opened its doors for supra-regional charity events. These include: In 1991, Barbara Genscher, wife of the Federal Foreign Minister and patron of the German Heart Foundation, and the NRW Art Circle invited guests from all over the country to a Mozart concert at the castle.

Since 2005, Nörvenich has held civil weddings and other events during the summer months.

== Architecture ==
The modern two-storey brick schloss, which preserved its 18th century appearance marked by large rectangular dormers tiled hipped roof, and "tail hoods". The core of the castle, dated back to 15th century, has three turrets embedded in the corners of the structure under tail hoods. The western and northern inner walls are built on a square plan and reinforced with four corner towers.

The west wing features a slender round-corner tower and a bay window, which was added c. 1565 copying the design of the Konradsheim Castle in Lechenich. In 1723, the two-winged medieval castle was converted into a symmetrical court of honour with an eastern-route entrance. The east wing was built as a counterpart to the west wing, borrowing the motif of the round corner tower and the bay window from the earlier buildings. A corridor building with a pilaster portal and a terrace with an open staircase were added to the south front of the old mansion.

Around 1950, the greater part of the roof collapsed, and in the 1982 restoration the ceilings were moulded out of stucco in the Regency style, and the ceiling painting of the Assumption of Mary in the south front of the old mansion. The castle chapel is preserved on the ground floor. The buildings of the western half of the outer bailey, which was built around 1700, were demolished in 1902. In 1980/81 the eastern half with square corner towers were restored from a ruinous state.

By the organization arranging events at the schloss, the three wings are called the Prince's Wing, the Alexander Wing, and the Knight's Wing.

== Museum and archive ==
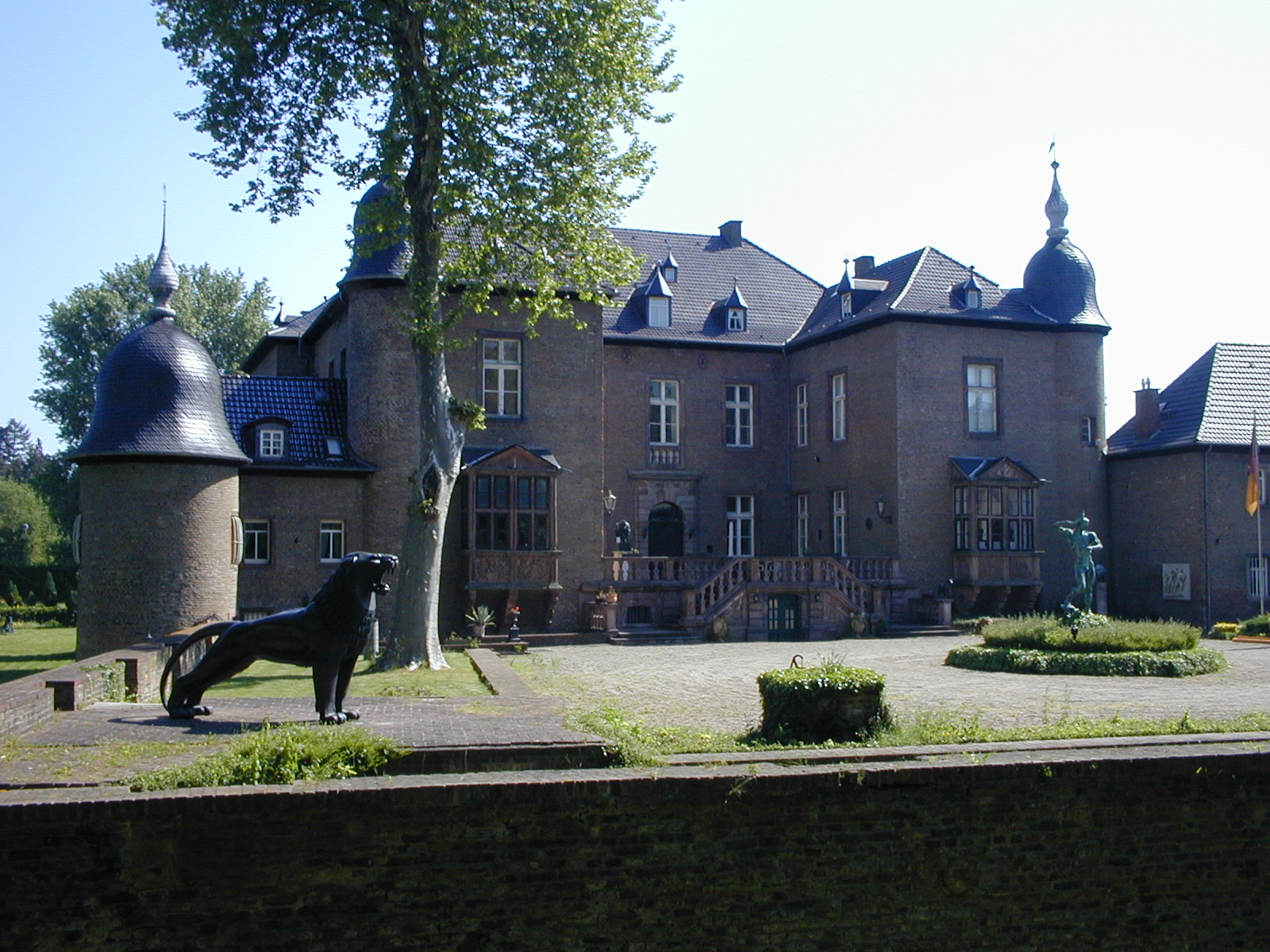
Front view of the mansion and Prometheus statue (2005)

Joe F. Bodenstein was a parliamentary correspondent in Bonn and Berlin, and received the Order of Merit of the Federal Republic of Germany from Federal President Roman Herzog in 1998. Bodenstein had been Arno Breker's art dealer based in Paris and New York. In 1985, he and his brother Marco J. Bodenstein opened an Arno Breker Private Museum arranged in Schloss Nörvenich. It was renamed the Museum of European Art in 1990s. which is essentially dedicated to the works of Arno Breker and grew to include the art of Salvador Dalí and Ernst Fuchs. In 1991, German Foreign Minister Hans-Dietrich Genscher took part in the opening ceremony for the Salvador Dalí exhibition.

The museum has had the 1940 photograph of the Arno Breker Relief (The Victim) in its collection, as well as the "colossal" bust of Salvador Dali, which Breker created in the 1970s, and bronze relief "Kameraden" (1941). Breker's bronze statue of "Prometheus" is displayed in front of the main entrance.

The castle representatives frequently capture in films and reports the cultural and public life at the castle, including museum exhibitions and concerts, subsequently registered in the museum archive. These include, among others, the following film documents:

- 2017 Musica Humana Lajos Tar at Nörvenich Castle; (DVD) Film author Koka Wirtz (nrwision.de)
- Sculptures and Music (DVD) by Marco J. Bodenstein.
- Nörvenich Castle in Josef Porschen’s Four Seasons.
- Rose Festival at Nörvenich Castle, film by Kinga Borowska and Patrick Bodenstein.
- 2020 Facts and stories about Nörvenich Castle, documented by Klaus Wirtz / Nörvenich Local History and History Society.

== Literature ==
- K.H. Oleszowsky: „Burgen und Schlösser der ehemaligen preußischen Rheinprovinz“ (Alexander Duncker) damals und heute, (2012/13) ISBN 978-3-00-042292-8
- Stefania Ney: "Lebendige Heimat" Museumsführer für den Kreis Düren; 2013 Edition winterwork. ISBN 978-3-86468-546-0
- Henk Verbeek: „Land an der Rur", Baudenkmäler und europäische Geschichte entlang des Flusses Rur in Belgien, Deutschland und den Niederlanden; 2014 Edition „Kunststrom Rur“ Gemeinde Allendale, NL.
- Petropoulos, Jonathan (2014). "Artists Under Hitler Collaboration and Survival in Nazi Germany". Yale University Press. ISBN 9780300197471.
