= Nörvenich =

- Municipality
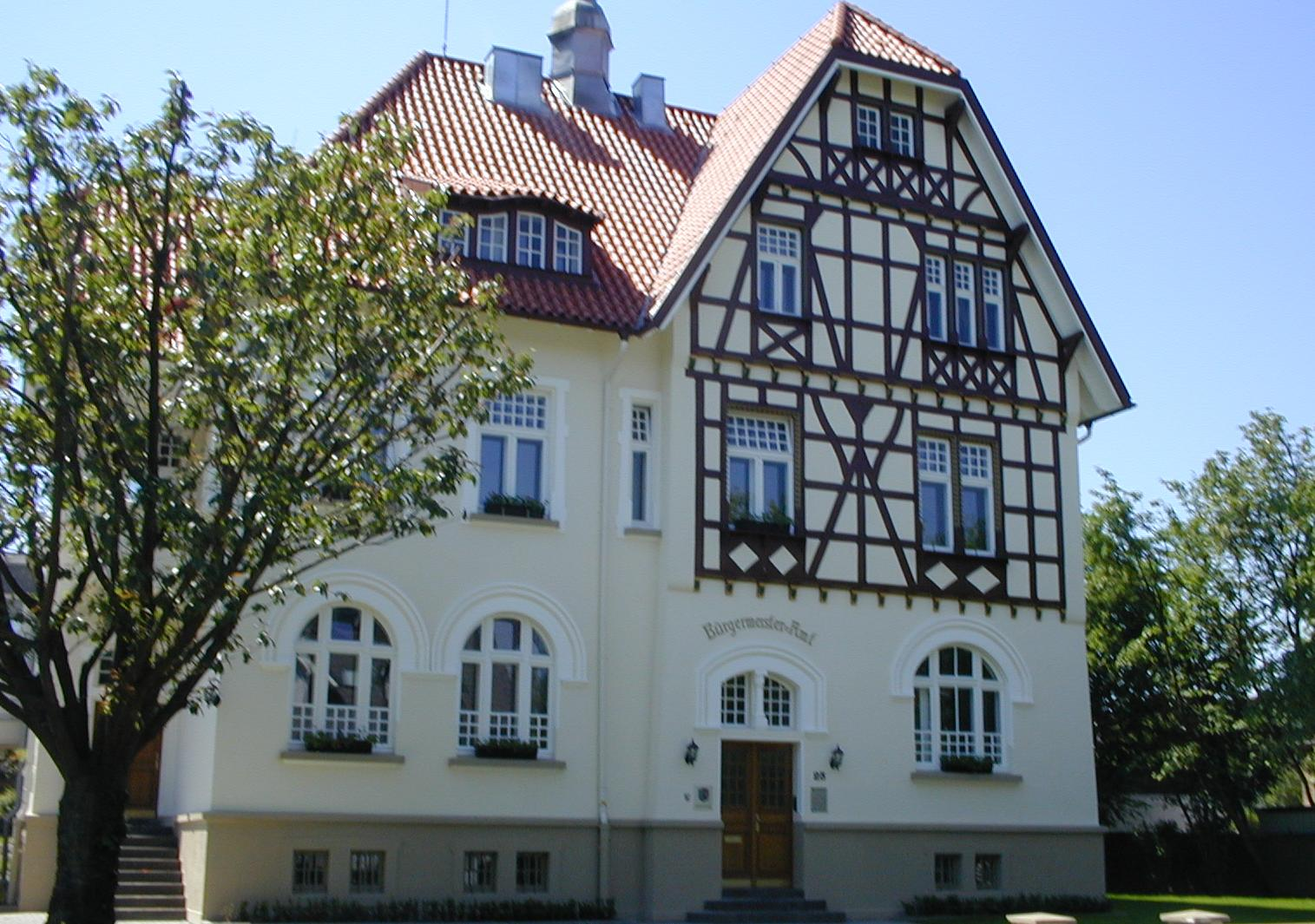
- Town hall

- Coat of arms

- Location of Nörvenich within Düren district
- Interactive map of Nörvenich
- Location within Germany Location within North Rhine-Westphalia
- Coordinates: 50°48′N 6°39′E
- Country: Germany
- State: North Rhine-Westphalia
- Admin. region: Köln
- District: Düren
- Subdivisions: 14

Government
  - Mayor (2020–25): Timo Czech (CDU)

Area
  - Total: 66.21 km^{2} (25.56 sq mi)
- Elevation: 110 m (360 ft)

Population (2025-12-31)
  - Total: 12,162
  - Density: 183.7/km^{2} (475.8/sq mi)
- Time zone: UTC+01:00 (CET)
  - Summer (DST): UTC+02:00 (CEST)
- Postal codes: 52388
- Dialling codes: 02426
- Vehicle registration: DN
- Website: www.noervenich.de

Nörvenich (German pronunciation: [ˈnœʁvənɪç]) is a municipality in the district of Düren in the state of North Rhine-Westphalia, Germany. It is located about 10 km (6 mi) east of Düren.

== Population ==
Historical population

Year	Pop.	±% p.a.
1965	7,260	—
1970	8,156	+2.35%
1975	8,330	+0.42%
1980	9,269	+2.16%
1985	9,215	−0.12%
1990	9,123	−0.20%
1995	10,760	+3.36%

Year	Pop.	±% p.a.
2000	11,502	+1.34%
2005	11,457	−0.08%
2010	11,045	−0.73%
2015	10,552	−0.91%
2020	10,667	+0.22%
2025	12,162	+2.66%

Source: Landesdatabank Nordrhein-Westfalen

== See also ==
- Nörvenich Air Base

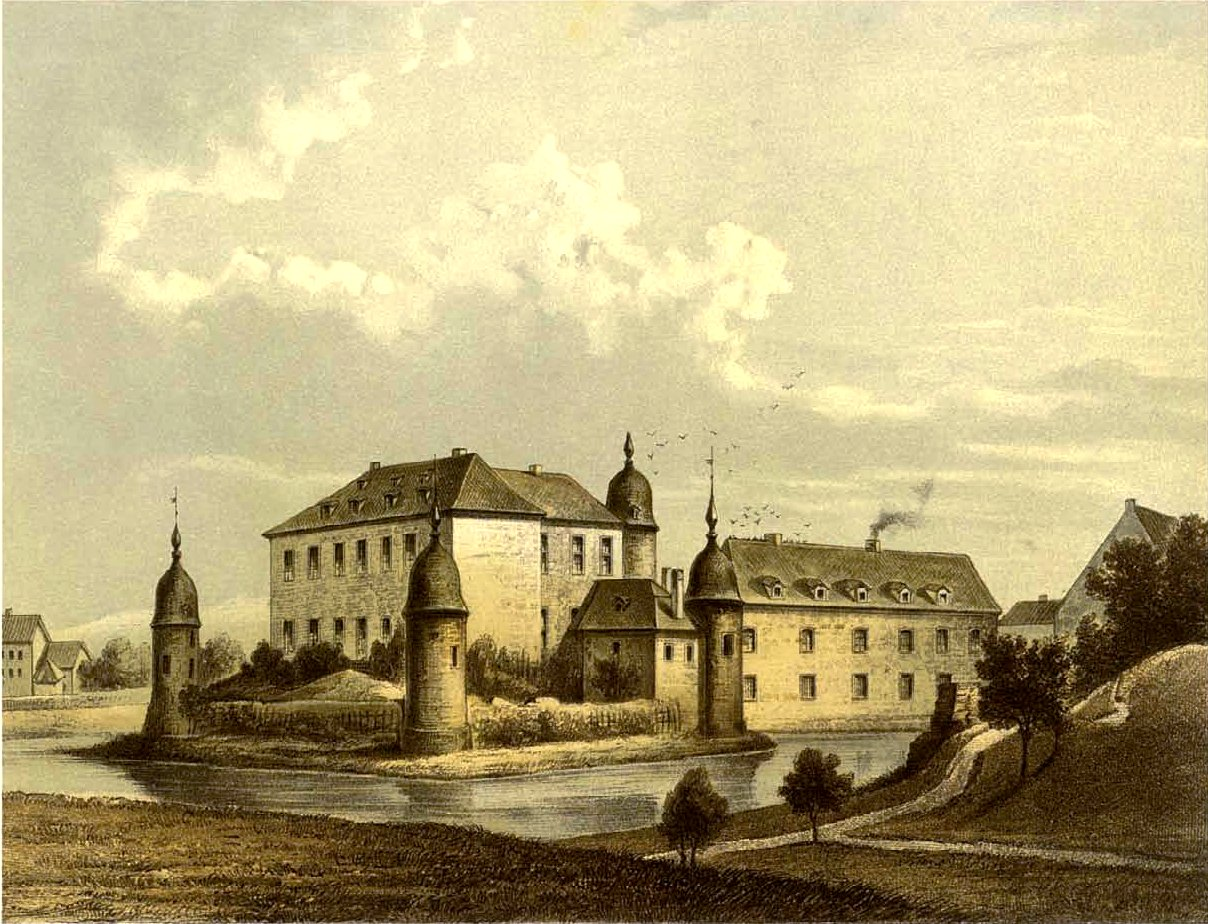
Schloss Nörvenich
