= David Lee Stone =

English fantasy author

- Born: 25 January 1978 (age 48)
- Writing career
- Period: 1993-
- Subject: Fantasy comedy
- Notable works: The Illmoor Chronicles; Gladiator Boy
- Website: www.davidleestone.co.uk

David Lee Stone (born 25 January 1978) is an English fantasy author best known for his series of books The Illmoor Chronicles, published by Disney between 2003 and 2007. He has also written under the pseudonyms David Grimstone and Rotterly Ghoulstone, among others.

He co-founded Kingsbrook Publishing with his wife Chiara Stone in 2022. The company was dissolved in 2024.

== Early work ==
Stone started writing at eight years old. His first ever appearance in print was in the letters section of the science fiction comic 2000 AD in April 1993. His first short story, The Dulwich Assassins was published in Xenos magazine in April 1997, and was later reprinted in Knights of Madness, a fantasy anthology edited by Peter Haining.

Between 1997 and 2002 he wrote short stories, review columns and articles, some of which appeared in publications such as Interzone, SFX, Games Workshop's Citadel Journal, The Edge and many others.

Stone has performed at the Hay and Edinburgh Book Festivals. He also worked in Bulgaria for the British Council, reading his works and talking about story-creation with teenagers in Sofia. He was a Guest of Honour for Disney Hyperion at the 2004 Book Expo America.

== Career ==
In 2002, Stone's agent sold the first three books of his Illmoor Chronicles to UK publishing giant Hodder Headline. He continued this series until 2007.

In 2014, Stone's Illmoor Chronicles series was rereleased to Ebook platforms.

Between 2008 and 2010, Stone wrote and published the Gladiator Boy series under Hodder.

In 2022, Stone self-published his autobiography, Too Much Information.

== Personal life ==
Stone was born at QEQM Hospital on 25 January 1978 in Margate, Kent. He attended St George's Church of England Foundation School in Broadstairs.

He is autistic, and has fought depression for most of his adult life.

Stone currently lives in Ramsgate, England. He is married to designer Chiara Stone, co-founder of the pet brand, Hoobynoo. The couple have two children.

== Bibliography ==
Stone’s works span multiple fantasy series and standalone novels, including The Illmoor Chronicles, Gladiator Boy, and works published under pseudonyms.
