= The Illmoor Chronicles =

Book series by David Lee Stone

- The cover of the series' first book, The Ratastrophe Catastrophe
- Author: David Lee Stone
- Language: English
- Genre: Fantasy comedy
- Publisher: Hodder Children's Books
- Published: June 2003
- No. of books: 6

The Illmoor Chronicles is a series of books for children written by English author David Lee Stone. The fantasy books are all set in the world of Illmoor, a fictional continent.

The series consists of six books: The Ratastrophe Catastrophe, The Yowler Foul-Up (2004), The Shadewell Shenanigans (2005), The Dwellings Debacle (2006), The Vanquish Vendetta (2006), and the series finale, The Coldstone Conflict (2007).

The first two books of the series were also released in Dutch translations as De rampzalige ratzooi (2004) and Yankergeklungel (2005).

The Illmoor Chronicles were Stone's first books, and, after having been rejected by several publishers, in 2003 he received a £500,000 contract for the initial trilogy. The comedic writing has been compared to that of Terry Pratchett and Douglas Adams. Stone believes that he lost creative control of the series due to pressure from publisher Disney to meet unrealistic sales goals, citing their decision to publish three books from a manuscript which he had intended to be a single story.
