= Aunt Sally (band) =

Japanese punk band

- Origin: Osaka, Japan
- Genre: Post-punk
- Years active: 1978–1980
- Labels: Vanity; P-Vine
- Past members: Phew; Bikke; Kataoka; Takashi Maruyama; Mayu

Aunt Sally was a Japanese post-punk band formed in Osaka. It consisted of Phew, Bikke, Mayu, Kataoka, and Takashi Maruyama. The band released a self-titled album in 1979.

== History ==
In 1977, Phew went to London to see the Sex Pistols live. Back in Osaka, she formed Aunt Sally.

The band consisted of vocalist Phew, guitarist Bikke, keyboardist Mayu, bassist Kataoka, and drummer Takashi Maruyama.

At first, the band played covers of the Who and Ramones.

The band's self-titled debut album, Aunt Sally, was released in 1979 through Vanity Records. The album was later reissued several times. AllMusic called it "a cult favorite that offers a snapshot of post-punk at its most freewheeling."

The band's live album, Live 1978–1979, was released in 2001.

The Japan Times described the band as "one of Japan's earliest punk groups."

== Discography ==
=== Studio albums ===
- Aunt Sally (Vanity Records, 1979)

=== Live albums ===
- Live 1978–1979 (P-Vine Records, 2001)
