= Jaki Liebezeit =

German musician (1938–2017)

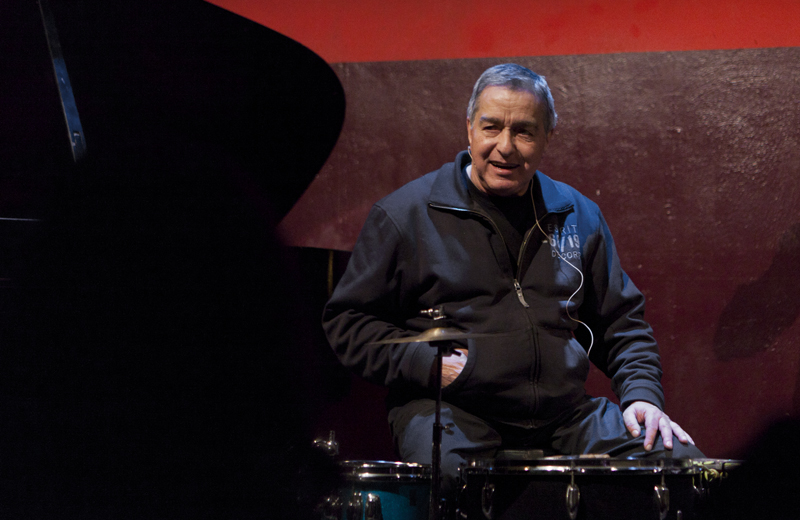
- Jaki Liebezeit, December 2011

Background information
- Born: Hans Liebezeit; 26 May 1938; Ostrau, Saxony, Germany
- Died: 22 January 2017 (aged 78) Cologne, Germany
- Genres: Krautrock; electronic; European free jazz
- Occupation: Musician
- Instruments: Drums; percussion; piano; trumpet
- Years active: 1961–2017
- Formerly of: Can

Jaki Liebezeit (born Hans Liebezeit; 26 May 1938 – 22 January 2017) was a German drummer, best known as a founding member of experimental rock band Can. He was called "one of the few drummers to convincingly meld the funky and the cerebral".

== Biography ==
=== Early life ===
Hans Liebezeit was born in the village of Ostrau south of Dresden, Germany. His mother, Elisabeth, was from Lower Saxony. His father, Karl Moritz Johannes Liebezeit, was the music teacher at the village school, specialising in accordion and violin, and taught both instruments to Hans, who treasured his father's accordion for the rest of his life. His father was forced to stop teaching music during the Nazi period, and died in mysterious circumstances on 18 August 1943.

Hans's early life was one of extreme poverty, with no running water at home, surviving on vegetables grown in the garden, and having to walk several kilometres to school daily. As the Soviets began to occupy East Germany, he became a refugee when his mother took him west to Hannoversch Münden to live with her mother and brother, just before the border closed in 1945. Hans's uncle ran a timber business, sprawling along the nearby river Weser. He built a small wooden house for Hans's family.

Hans joined the school orchestra, at first playing trumpet. When he changed to a different school in the nearby town of Kassel, the local school orchestra already had enough trumpeters and didn't have a drummer, so Hans started playing drums. There he met and befriended trumpeter Manfred Schoof. In his teen years, Hans embraced his high school nickname—"Jaki".

=== Musical career ===
==== Free jazz ====
In late 1958, Jaki moved to Cologne and enrolled at the Hochschule für Musik und Tanz Köln, encouraged by his friend Manfred Schoof. One of their teachers was Kurt Edelhagen. They shared a flat for the next three years, playing together as a loose collective of "Jazz Cookers" with multi-instrumentalist Gunter Hampel, saxophonist Olaf Kübler (who would later manage the krautrock group Amon Düül II) and Lothar Meid (future bassist with Amon Düül II). Kübler left Cologne in 1960, and Gerd Dudek joined the Jazz Cookers to play saxophone.

While performing with the Jazz Cookers the Art Blakey and the Jazz Messengers visited Cologne. According to Jaki, "the band all wanted to play, except Art Blakey, so they asked him to play in his place", which Jaki did. At one of the Gigi Campi intellectual parties in Cologne, Jaki met jazz drummer Kenny Clarke, who later became Jaki's inspiration for using a limited drum set. He admired the playing of jazz drummer Elvin Jones.

In 1963, Jaki was offered a gig as full-time drummer at the Jamboree club in Barcelona, performing there for the next seven months with pianist Tete Montoliu. At that time, the Jamboree hosted touring musicians from the United States, and Jaki had an opportunity to play shows with Chet Baker and Don Cherry. While playing at the club, Liebezeit was impressed by flamenco music and afro-Cuban jazz, recognizing their rhythms as superior to those of jazz.

Schoof put together a quintet in 1965 featuring Jaki on drums, Buschi Niebergall on bass, saxophonist Gerd Dudek, and pianist Alexander von Schlippenbach. The quintet was inspired by the liberated style of jazz music played by Ornette Coleman, Albert Ayler, and John Coltrane with "an additional cool hard edge" from the mid-sixties Miles Davis Quintet. Schoof's quintet played prestigious festivals at Antibes and Lugano, and performed in Prague and Warsaw. A record deal with CBS Records International led to the album Voices (1966). Schoof later claimed his quintet were "the first free jazz group in Germany".

Other than Voices, Jaki can be heard on the studio recordings made by the Schoof Quintet in Munich (resurfaced in 2013), on scattered recordings of the Globe Unity Orchestra, and early Quintet tapes of Swedish drummer Sven-Åke Johansson.

Schoof had a connection with composer Irmin Schmidt, who asked Schoof's quintet in 1966 to perform on Schmidt's soundtrack project for West German film Zwei wie wir – und die Eltern wissen von nichts. The quintet also took part in a recording of "Die Befristeten" composed by Bernd Alois Zimmermann, which came out on a Wergo label in 1967 and accompanied "Ode to Freedom in the Form of a Dance of Death", a radio production of a play by Elias Canetti.

==== Motorik ====
By the late sixties, Jaki felt burned out with free jazz, later saying "there were too many rules in free jazz" with "no real freedom in it, because it was so limited" in regards to Drum pulse. He steered in the direction of pulsing rhythm, which eventually evolved into Jaki's trademark motorik beat. In late 1967, Jaki was searching for new opportunities, and when Irmin Schmidt asked for a drummer recommendation, decided to sign up himself. Schmidt was fascinated by the rhythms mastered by Jaki, buying tickets to his shows "every time Schmidt could get hold of him", but Schmidt only heard Jaki playing free jazz, which he didn't favor. Jaki surprised Schmidt, when he turned up at the band's rehearsal himself and played a drum beat with a routine inspired by the world music, removed from free jazz. The next year, Schmidt, Jaki, Holger Czukay, and Michael Karoli eventually formed a band, later known as Can. His drumming was prominent in the band's sound, particularly in his much-admired contribution to the side-long "Halleluhwah" on Tago Mago.

Jaki contributed for Michael Rother's late-1970s solo albums, drumming with his distinctive motorik beat.

In 1980, Jaki became a member of Phantomband, and formed drum ensembles such as Drums off Chaos and Club off Chaos. Later he recorded with numerous musicians, such as Jah Wobble and Philip Jeck, with whom he produced an album for Jah Wobble's 30 Hertz Records, and contributed drums and percussion to many albums as a guest musician over the years, such as the Depeche Mode album Ultra and Brian Eno's album Before and After Science. In later years, he worked with Burnt Friedman on the Secret Rhythms albums and with Schiller on the Atemlos album.

Jaki also worked on the Cyclopean EP, released on 11 February 2013 on 12" and download for Mute Records. Cyclopean was a project that involved, other than Jaki, Irmin Schmidt from Can alongside long time collaborators Jono Podmore (Kumo / Metamono) and musician and producer Burnt Friedman. He recorded with Hans Joachim Irmler of Faust an album called Flut, released 18 July 2014.

In 2013, he recorded the album The Obscure Department with British singer-songwriter Robert Coyne. Two more albums with Coyne, Golden Arc (2014) and I Still Have This Dream (2016), followed.

Liebezeit died of pneumonia on 22 January 2017. A tribute concert to Liebezeit took place on 22 January 2018 at the Philharmonic Hall, Cologne.

=== Personal life ===
Liebezeit was married to Birgit Berger, a painter. The couple had two sons named Ben and Marlon.

== Style ==
As early as 1961, Jaki got attracted to world music, listening to North African, Indian, Turkish, and Iranian music. He admired the playing of jazz drummer Elvin Jones.

Liebezeit is best known for his exceptional "metronome" style of playing. Other members of Can have suggested that he sounds as though he is "half-man, half machine." Liebezeit described the intention behind his metronome rhythm as "always pushing the band, similar to the director of an orchestra. You have to keep the orchestra together, make the musicians come to that one point where the beat is. And play like the people come together and make a unit."

Michael Karoli, Can's guitarist, lauded the partnership between Jaki and the band's vocalist Malcolm Mooney. ‘He was probably the most important point of reference in the band. I’ve never heard anything like that elsewhere. How those two fed each other with sounds!'

== Discography ==
With Can:

- Monster Movie (1969)
- Soundtracks (1970)
- Tago Mago (1971)
- Ege Bamyasi (1972)
- Future Days (1973)
- Soon Over Babaluma (1973)
- Landed (1975)
- Flow Motion (1976)
- Saw Delight (1977)
- Out of Reach (1978)
- Can (1979)
- Rite Time (1989)

With Holger Czukay:

- Movies – drums and congas (1979)
- On the Way to the Peak of Normal – drums (1981)
- Full Circle – drums, percussion, trumpet, and backing vocals (1982)
- Snake Charmer – drums on "Hold on to Your Dreams" (1983)
- Der Osten ist Rot – drums, trumpet, piano, organ (1984)
- Rome Remains Rome – drums, trumpet, piano, percussion (1987)
- Plight & Premonition – infra sound (1988)
- Flux + Mutability – percussion and African flute (1989)
- Radio Wave Surfer – drums (1991)
- "La Lu Na" from La Luna – bass drum, percussion (2000)
- Time and Tide (2001)

With Irmin Schmidt:

- Filmmusik Vol.2 (1982)
- "You Make Me Nervous" from Filmmusik Vol. 3 & 4 (1983)
- You Make Me...Nervous (1984)
- Roll On, Euphrates (1986)
- Musk At Dusk (1987)
- "Zu Nah Dran" from Filmmusik Vol. 5 (1989)
- Impossible Holidays (1991)
- Gormenghast (2000)
- Flut (2014)

With Alex Wiska:

- Alex (1973)
- That's The Deal (1975)
- "What The Children Say" from So Simple (1984)
- Sazou as "Alex Oriental Experience" (1988)
- 9. as "Alex Oriental Experience" (1990)
- Jam (20 Jahre) as "Alex Oriental Experience" (1992)
- Tales Of Purple Sally as "Alex Oriental Experience" (1995)

With Michael Rother:

- Flammende Herzen (1977)
- Sterntaler (1978)
- Katzenmusik (1979)
- Fernwärme (1982)
- Radio (2000)

With Phantom Band

- Phantom Band (1980), recorded with Jaki's former bandmates Rosko Gee and Holger Czukay, as well as Dominik Von Senger and Helmut Zerlett
- Freedom Of Speech (1981)
- Nowhere (1984)

With Joachim Witt:

- Silberblick (1980)
- Edelweiß (1982)
- Wieder Bin Ich Nicht Geflogen (1984)
- Märchenblau (1990)

With Phew:

- Phew (1981)
- Our Likeness (1992)

With Eurythmics:

- In The Garden (1982)
  - "Never Gonna Cry Again" (1981)
  - "Take Me To Your Heart" (1981)

With Gianna Nannini:

- Latin Lover (1982)
- X Forza EX Amore (1993)

With Damo Suzuki Band:

- Live In Berlin 1986, Quartier Latin (1986)
- Vernissage (1998)
- P.R.O.M.I.S.E. (7CD Box) (1998)

With Jah Wobble:

- Take Me To God as "Jah Wobble's Invaders Of The Heart" (1994)
- "Spinner" and "Transmitter and Trumpet" from Spinner) as "Brian Eno/Jah Wobble" (1994)
- The Inspiration Of William Blake (1996)
- The Celtic Poets as "Jah Wobble's Invaders Of The Heart" (1997)
- "One In 7" from The Light Programme (1997)
- "Paternal Kindness" from Umbra Sumus (1998)
- The 30Hz Collection (1999)
- Deep Space (1999)
- Full Moon Over The Shopping Mall as "Jah Wobble & The Invaders Of The Heart" (1999)
- Live In Concert "as Jah Wobble's Solaris" (2002)

With Pluramon:

- "Peak" from Pick Up Canyon (1996)
- Render Bandits (1998)

With Club Off Chaos:

- The Change Of The Century (1998)
- Club Off Chaos (1998)
- Par Et Impar (2000)
- "Club Off Chaos With Kumo – thunder" from Kumo And Friends – Kumo
- Drums Off Chaos & Jens-Uwe Beyer with Jens-Uwe Beyer (2011)
- Compass (2017)
- Centre (2018)

With Burnt Friedman:

- Secret Rhythms (2002)
- Out In The Sticks with David Sylvian (2005)
- Secret Rhythms III (2008)
- Secret Rhythms IV (2011)
- Zokuhen (2012)
- Secret Rhythms V (2013)
- Eurydike EP with João Pais (2020)

With Robert Coyne:

- The Obscure Department (2013)
- Golden Arc (2014)
- I Still Have This Dream (2016)

With others:

- Und Erbarmt Sich Seiner Elenden (Vier Swingende Weihnachtslieder) – Peter Janssens (1965)
- Voices – Manfred Schoof Quintett (1966)
- Globe Unity – Alexander von Schlippenbach (1967)
- "Die Befristeten" / Improvisationen Über Die Oper "Die Soldaten" / "Tratto" – Bernd Alois Zimmermann (1967)
- Manfred Schoof Sextett – Manfred Schoof Sextett (1967)
- "Backwater" from Before and After Science – Brian Eno (1977)
- "Harlie's Waltz" and "Musik, Music, Musique" from Europium – Zeus (1979)
- Fata Morgana – Richard Schneider Jr. (1980)
- Kraft – Mau Mau (1982)
- Morje, Morje – De Bläck Fööss (1982)
- Colours And Soul – Dunkelziffer (1983)
- Mistress – Gabi Delgado (1983)
- Bewegliche Ziele – Plaza Hotel (1983)
- "Take All My Troubles Away" – Nicolle Meyer (1983)
- Rio Reiser –Dr. Sommer (1984)
- "Under Your Spell" from Up In Flames – Twenty Colours (1984)
- "Cold Cold World" – The Flood (1984)
- Néondian (Klausi Scheißt Auf Hollywood) – Klaus Dinger + Rheinita Bella Düsseldorf (1985)
- "Der Kapitän" from Trio Farfarello 2 – Trio Farfarello (1986)
- Westernhagen – Westernhagen (1987)
- Luckiest Man In The Western World – Julian Dawson (1988)
- Born In The Forest – Hardy Hepp (1988)
- Hinter Den Wolken – Kagermann (1989)
- The Mermaid – Christa Fast, Bela B, Annie Lennox, Peter Gabriel, Holger Czukay (1992)
- "Ich Rase Op Dr Stell" and "Merowinger Hop" – The Piano Has Been Drinking... (1992)
- Intermission...Eine Permanente Helle Fläche – Frank Köllges (1992)
- "Meet Your Maker" from Ekstasis – Nicky Skopelitis (1993)
- In A Different Light – Rainbirds (1993)
- "Cyberg Reality" from The Second – Dominik von Senger (1995)
- Broad View Gardens – Amber Street (1995)
- Magic Box – Bel Canto (1996)
- Fisch Im Wasser – Blazzmusik – Talking Horns (1996)
- "The Bottom Line" from Ultra – Depeche Mode (1997)
- Alluvial – Fetisch Park (1997)
- "The Divine Self" from City Of Light + Hashisheen – Bill Laswell (1997)
- Wake Up And Dream – Ekstasis (1998)
- Deluge – Michael Karoli & Polly Eltes (1998)
- Mir – Mir (1999)
- Tar – Dirx (2001)
- Baum – Maria de Alvear, Drums Off Chaos (2001)
- The Sailor Not The Sea – Ozark Henry (2004)
- "Hôtel De Flandres 1" from The Soft Machine – Ozark Henry (2005)
- Givt – Datenverarbeiter vs. Jaki Liebezeit (2006)
- Givt Return – Datenverarbeiter Vs. Jaki Liebezeit (2007)
- Diamonds Fall – Phillip Boa And The Voodoo Club (2009)
- Playground Two – BILL (2011)
- Evolver – Magnetik North (2012)
- The Cyclopean EP – Kumo with Irmin Schmidt and Burnt Friedman (2012)
- Vermont – Vermont (2014)
- Elevation – Fetisch Park (2014)
- "To The Last Of Imaginary Solutions" from L'Argot Del Soroll – Pascal Comelade (2015)
- "Leidenschaft" from Zeitreise – Schiller (2016)

== Videography ==
- Romantic Warriors IV: Krautrock (2019)

== General references ==
- Young, Rob; Schmidt, Irmin (2018). All Gates Open: The Story of Can. London: Faber and Faber. ISBN 978-0571311491.
