= Holger Czukay =

German musician (1938–2017)

- Czukay in 1973

Background information
- Born: Holger Schüring; 24 March 1938; Free City of Danzig (present-day Gdańsk, Poland)
- Died: 5 September 2017 (aged 79) Weilerswist, Germany
- Genres: Krautrock; ambient
- Instruments: Bass, guitar, keyboards, percussion, drums, vocals, French horn
- Years active: 1968–2017
- Labels: Electrola; Virgin; Mute; Grönland
- Formerly of: Can
- Spouse: Ursula Schüring (m. 1989)

Holger Czukay (/ˈʃʊkaɪ/), (born Holger Schüring , 24 March 1938 – 5 September 2017), 'was a German musician who co-founded the krautrock group Can. Described as "successfully bridg[ing] the gap between pop and the avant-garde", Czukay also created early important examples of ambient music, explored "world music" well before the term was coined, and was a pioneer of sampling.

== Biography ==
=== Early life ===
Czukay was born Holger Schüring on 24 March 1938 in the Free City of Danzig (present-day Gdańsk, Poland). According to Holger, his grandfather told Third Reich officials that their family "must be Aryan", and came up with a family tree supporting the claim. The family also changed their Polish last name "Czukay" to Schüring, a German name. In early 1945, after World War II, his family was expelled from Poland. They booked tickets for a passage on the ship MV Wilhelm Gustloff, which was due to depart on 13 January 1945, but at the last moment his grandmother changed her mind and took them to the railway station, where they boarded a train carrying wounded soldiers to Berlin. The Gustloff was sunk by a Soviet torpedo, and almost ten thousand passengers died.

The Czukay family resettled in Limburg an der Lahn, and when Holger was in his teens, moved to Duisburg, where he attended the Gerhard Mercator Scientific School and worked part-time in a radio and TV repair shop. While working at the shop he became fond of the aural qualities of radio broadcasts (anticipating his use of shortwave radio broadcasts as musical elements) and became familiar with the rudiments of electrical repair and engineering. Around that time, in the late fifties, Czukay was playing double bass in local jazz bands, including his own Holger Czukay Quintet. His fascination with music led to Czukay relocating to East Berlin and enrolling at the Hochschule für Musik Hanns Eisler Berlin in February 1962. Holger was expelled from the Berlin Music Academy, but kept pursuing his music studies.

Czukay signed up to Karlheinz Stockhausen's new-music course in Cologne, studying under Stockhausen from 1963 to 1966. While studying he met his future Can bandmates—Irmin Schmidt and David C. Johnson. In May 1966, Czukay resettled to St Gallen (Switzerland) taking up a lecturing post in music at the Institut auf dem Rosenberg. One of his pupils, Michael Karoli, familiarised Czukay with the contemporary rock music, introducing him to The Beatles, Velvet Underground, and Frank Zappa. Holger particularly liked "I Am the Walrus", impressed by its unusual musical structure and blasts of AM radio noise; perpetrating "avant-garde pranks in a pop/rock context". Czukay and Karoli played with rock pianist Tony Ashton and several members of his band, Remo Four, proposing an idea to form an experimental band, but didn't follow it through. When Michael was finishing school, Czukay was fired from the Institut auf dem Rosenberg, as Czukay explained, "for being too … er … intriguing!"

In late 1967, Czukay got a letter from Irmin inviting Holger to form a group in Cologne. Czukay brought Karoli with him.

=== Career ===
Czukay co-founded Can in 1968, where he played bass guitar, and undertook most of the recording and engineering for the group. During live performances Holger wore his signature white gloves using them while playing bass to protect his fingertips for tape editing, and also to absorb sweat. Rosko Gee, former bassist of the British band Traffic, joined the band in 1977, with Czukay handling only tapes and sound effects on the album Saw Delight, his final LP with the group before departing for a solo career. Czukay had been sidelined due to creative disputes and his failure to progress as a bassist, admitting his shortcomings on the instrument which he had taken up "almost by default" in the early days of Can.

After his departure from Can, Czukay recorded several solo albums. One of his trademarks was the use of shortwave radio sounds and his early pioneering of sampling, in those days involving the painstaking cutting and splicing of magnetic tapes. He would tape-record various sounds and snippets from shortwave and incorporate them into his compositions. He also used shortwave as a live, interactive musical instrument (such as on 1991's Radio Wave Surfer), a method of composition he termed "radio painting". Czukay stated "If you want to make something new, you shouldn't think too far beyond one certain idea".

Czukay continued to work with the former members of Can: playing bass on Irmin Schmidt's soundtrack pieces released in Filmmusik Vol.2 (1981), recording Full Circle (1982) with Jaki Liebezeit, and mastering Michael Karoli's debut album Deluge (1984). Czukay further collaborated with other musicians, including a series of albums with Jah Wobble and David Sylvian, two younger British musicians who shared his interest in blending pop music with experimental recording and sampling techniques. Other collaborators include U.N.K.L.E., Brian Eno, Eurythmics, and German Neue Deutsche Welle band Trio.

In 2009, after a problematic time with the record company that had been gradually re-releasing his albums on CD, Czukay began a new collaboration with the Claremont 56 record label, releasing vinyl-only remixes of tracks from earlier albums, as well as some new recordings. This approach changed Czukay's plans for his back catalogue, so that the original albums Der Osten ist Rot (1984), Rome Remains Rome (1987) and Moving Pictures (1993) are no longer being reissued (in the case of Moving Pictures, because the master tapes have degraded beyond repair). Instead, most of the tracks are being remade and newly organized as limited edition vinyl releases.

In 2018, it was announced that Czukay's work was being released in a box set, Cinema, including his solo works, collaborations, and unreleased material. It was released in March 2018.

=== Personal life ===
Holger Czukay was married for nearly thirty years to the German painter and singer Ursula Kloss (known professionally as Ursa Major, and later as U-She), with whom he collaborated on numerous multimedia pieces. Ursula Schüring (as she was called after marrying Holger Schüring under his real name) died on her 55th birthday (28 July 2017) after having been severely debilitated by illness for over a decade.

=== Death ===
On 5 September 2017, Czukay was found dead in his apartment, converted from Can's old studio in Weilerswist, near Cologne. The New York Times reported that he had died on the same day, but the cause of his death was the subject of a police investigation. His death was eventually assumed to have been from natural causes.

== Discography ==
=== Solo ===
- Canaxis 5 (1969, remastered and expanded 2006)
- Movies (1979, remastered and expanded 2007)
- On the Way to the Peak of Normal (1981)
- Full Circle (1982) collaboration with Jah Wobble and Jaki Liebezeit (re-issue of a UK-only EP, expanded with two extra tracks)
- Der Osten ist Rot (1984)
- Rome Remains Rome (1987)
- Plight & Premonition (1988, remastered 2018) collaboration with David Sylvian; remixed by Sylvian in 2002 and subsequently released in 2018
- Flux + Mutability (1989, remastered 2018) collaboration with David Sylvian; reissued combined with Plight & Premonition in 2018
- Radio Wave Surfer (1991, remastered and expanded 2006) Live recordings made in 1984, 1986 & 1987
- Moving Pictures (1993)
- Clash (1998, remastered and expanded 2007) collaboration with Dr. Walker
- Good Morning Story (1999, remastered and expanded 2006)
- La Luna (2000, remastered and expanded 2007)
- Linear City (2001, remastered and remixed 2006)
- Time and Tide (2001, remastered 2007) with U-She
- The New Millennium (2003) with U-She
- 21st Century (2007) with Ursa Major – voice, Drew Kalapach – electronics
- Travellers (2014) with Bison
- 11 Years Innerspace (2015) 500 limited edition vinyl LP worldwide;
- Sushi. Roti. Reibekuchen (2024) with Brian Eno and J. Peter Schwalm on August 27, 1998
- Gvoon – Brennung 1 (2025)
- Gvoon - Version 2-11 (2025)

=== Appearances ===
- Rastakraut Pasta (1980) Mœbius & Plank
- Filmmusik Vol.2 (1981) with Irmin Schmidt
- Phew (1981) with Phew, Conny Plank, Jaki Liebezeit
- Snake Charmer (1983) EP, collaboration with Jah Wobble, The Edge, and Ben Mandelson
- Deluge (1984) with Michael Karoli
- Brilliant Trees (1984), with David Sylvian
- Words with the Shaman (1985), with David Sylvian
- Freemix (2004)
- Daemon In The Bar (2006) with Bob Humid

=== Singles / EPs ===
- Biomutanten / Menetekel (as Les Vampyrettes with Conny Plank) (1981)
- Ode to Perfume / Fragrance (2009) 10 inch single, limited edition of 500
- Way to LA (2010) 10 inch single collaboration with Bison and Ursa Major
- Let's Get Hot / Let's Get Cool (2010)
- Persian Love (Remix) / My Persian Love (2010)
- Dream Again (2010) 10 inch double EP of remixes from The East Is Red and Rome Remains Rome
- Hit Hit Flop Flop (Remix) / Hey Baba Reebop (2011) 7 inch single, limited edition of 500
- Gvoon - Version 1 (2025) (HOLGER CZUKAY / die ANGEL & Zappi W. Diermaier)

=== Compilations ===
- Rome Remains Rome And Excerpts From Der Osten Ist Rot (1987)
- Der Osten Ist Rot / Rome Remains Rome (2014)
- Cinema (2018)
- Plight & Premonition / Flux & Mutability (2018)
- Claremont 56 Versions (2024)

== See also ==
- Krieg der Töne (experimental film, 1987)
- List of ambient music artists

== Works cited ==
Young, Rob; Schmidt, Irmin (2018). All Gates Open: The Story of Can (e-book ed.). London: Faber and Faber. ISBN 978-0-571-31151-4.
