= The Increased Difficulty of Concentration (album) =

1994 album by Air Liquide

Studio album by Air Liquide
- Released: October 25, 1994
- Recorded: Various: Ocean Blue Elektronisches Klanglabor; (Cologne, Germany); Airbase 6000; (Frankfurt, Germany)
- Genre: Ambient techno, acid house
- Length: 140:19
- Label: Sm:)e

Air Liquide chronology
Nephology (1993)	The Increased Difficulty of Concentration (1994)	Red (1995)

Professional ratings
Review scores
Source	Rating
Allmusic	4.5/5 stars

The Increased Difficulty of Concentration is the fourth studio album by Air Liquide, independently released on October 25, 1994 by Sm:)e Communications.

== Track listing ==
All lyrics are written by Mary Susan Applegate; all music is composed by Ingmar Koch and Cem Oral.

Disc one – Air Disc
No.	Title	Length
1.	"Things Happen"	2:14
2.	"Unraveling My Curls"	7:43
3.	"Ballad of the Nameless Guitar Player"	7:19
4.	"Synsonic"	9:45
5.	"Im Erlenmeyerkolben Part I"	2:27
6.	"Cassiopeia"	6:09
7.	"Gelb (Remix II)"	3:30
8.	"Robot Wars Symphony" (Part I – System Engaged)	14:01
9.	"Robot Wars Symphony" (Part II – Unlocked)	4:12
10.	"Robot Wars Symphony" (Part III – Psychocandies)	6:39
11.	"Robot Wars Symphony" (Part IV – One Below Zero)	2:12

Disc two – Liquid Disc
No.	Title	Length
1.	"Liquid Air" (Bionaut mix)	5:29
2.	"This Is Not a Mind Trip" (Live at Love Parade '94)	6:05
3.	"Mandragora" (Part I)	6:10
4.	"Imago"	4:29
5.	"The Increased Difficulty of Concentration"	6:36
6.	"Sonority Cannon"	4:05
7.	"Ek-Stasis"	6:02
8.	"Tongues Of Fire"	4:21
9.	"Liquid Men With Liquid Hearts"	5:55
10.	"Space Brothers"	12:36
11.	"Stratus Static"	8:10
12.	"Theme From Robot Wars"	4:10

== Personnel ==
Adapted from The Increased Difficulty of Concentration liner notes.

Air Liquide

- Mary Susan Applegate – spoken word
- Ingmar Koch (as Dr. Walker) – electronics, programming
- Cem Oral (as Jammin' Unit) – electronics, programming

Production and additional personnel

- Air Liquide – production
- Craig Bevan – mastering
- Yorck Dertinger – photography
- Rebecca Meek – art direction, design

== Release history ==
Region	Date	Label	Format	Catalog
United States	1994	Sm:)e	CD	SM-8004
