= Kerrier District =

Kerrier District may refer to:

== Places ==
- Kerrier, a former administrative district in Cornwall
- Kerrier (hundred), one of the hundreds of Cornwall

== Music ==
- Kerrier District (musician), one of a number of names used by the recording artist Luke Vibert
  - Kerrier District (album), an album by Kerrier District
  - Kerrier District 2, an album by Kerrier District
