= Sorry I Make You Lush =

Studio album by Wagon Christ
- Released: 21 June 2004
- Genre: Electronica, trip hop
- Label: Ninja Tune
- Producer: Wagon Christ

Wagon Christ chronology
Musipal (2001)	Sorry I Make You Lush (2004)	Toomorrow (2011)

Professional ratings
Aggregate scores
Source	Rating
Metacritic	75/100
Review scores
Source	Rating
AllMusic	4/5 stars
MusicOMH	favorable
Pitchfork	7.8/10
Playlouder	4/5 stars
PopMatters	mixed
Prefix	8.0/10
Resident Advisor	3.5/5
Splendid	favorable
Tiny Mix Tapes	4/5 stars

Sorry I Make You Lush is a studio album by Luke Vibert, released under the alias Wagon Christ. It was released in 2004 on Ninja Tune. The CD version includes a QuickTime video of "Receiver".

== Critical reception ==
At Metacritic, which assigns a weighted average score out of 100 to reviews from mainstream critics, the album received an average score of 75% based on 11 reviews, indicating "generally favorable reviews".

Jonathan Zwickel of Pitchfork gave the album a 7.8 out of 10, describing it as "an extremely listenable, laughable album, a futuristic freakshow of deep, stirring melodies and innovative beat arrangements." John Bush of AllMusic gave the album 4 stars out of 5, commenting that "Vibert's interplay of beats and melodies is fascinating by itself."

== Track listing ==
No.	Title	Length
1.	"Saddic Gladdic"	4:52
2.	"I'm Singing"	5:43
3.	"The Funnies"	3:56
4.	"Shadows"	4:26
5.	"Quadra y Discos"	5:41
6.	"UBFormby"	3:36
7.	"Sci-Fi Staircase"	7:00
8.	"Sorry I Make You Lush"	3:44
9.	"Kwikwidetrax"	5:47
10.	"Nighty Night"	4:24

Japanese edition bonus tracks
No.	Title	Length
11.	"Deux Ans De Maïa"	2:46
12.	"Loose Loggins"	3:24

== Charts ==
Chart	Peak position
UK Independent Albums (OCC)	39
