= Throbbing Pouch =

Studio album by Wagon Christ
- Released: 20 March 1995
- Genre: Trip hop; instrumental hip hop; sampledelia; downtempo; electro
- Length: 76:12
- Label: Rising High
- Producer: Wagon Christ

Wagon Christ chronology
Phat Lab Nightmare (1994)	Throbbing Pouch (1995)	Tally Ho! (1998)

Throbbing Pouch is a studio album by English electronic musician Luke Vibert. His second studio album under the alias Wagon Christ, it was released on 20 March 1995 by Rising High Records.

== Musical style ==
AllMusic critic Sean Cooper described Throbbing Pouch as an album of "eazy-listening instrumental hip-hop" music "scattered with dime-store samples and goofy melodies".

== Release ==
Throbbing Pouch was released on 20 March 1995 by Rising High Records. The artwork for the album was designed by Jon Black.

== Critical reception ==
Professional ratings
Review scores
Source	Rating
AllMusic	5/5 stars
The Rolling Stone Album Guide	4/5 stars
Select	4/5

Reviewing Throbbing Pouch for Select, Gareth Grundy described the album as a "missing link" between Aphex Twin and Mo' Wax. He stated that "Vibert creates beautiful, evocative slivers of contemporary electro that manage to be both soothing and engaging." At the end of 1995, NME listed it as the year's 26th best album.

For AllMusic, Sean Cooper said that on Throbbing Pouch, "Luke Vibert's arranging skills are in rare form, reordering elements and dropping tracks in and out with liquid, barely noticeable aplomb." Cooper noted that the album "has long been regarded as one of trip-hop's most influential releases." Kembrew McLeod cited it as "a classic of the trip-hop canon" in The New Rolling Stone Album Guide (2004), and it was included at number 37 in Fact's 2015 list of the best trip hop albums of all time. Turk Dietrich of the American experimental music duo Belong wrote that Throbbing Pouch "may be the only LP that rivals" DJ Shadow's 1996 release Endtroducing..... "in the genre of sampledelia." Similarly, critic Simon Reynolds stated in Spin that Throbbing Pouch "easily rivals" Endtroducing "as a masterpiece of emotive, down-tempo sampladelia."

== Track listing ==
All tracks are written by Luke Vibert

No.	Title	Length
1.	"Intro"	0:22
2.	"Reedin"	4:43
3.	"Down Under"	8:16
4.	"Phase Everyday"	7:35
5.	"Throbbing Pouch"	5:24
6.	"Rexcist"	2:23
7.	"Floot"	7:08
8.	"Intermission"	2:47
9.	"Pull My Strings"	5:11
10.	"Spotlight"	5:50
11.	"Scrapes"	8:03
12.	"Night Owls"	2:41
13.	"E-Z Listener"	5:19
14.	"Vibes"	1:27
15.	"Underground Level"	2:31
16.	"Ring Piece"	4:26
17.	"All My Fingers"	2:06
Total length:		76:12
