= Marchica =

Spanish-American indie rock band

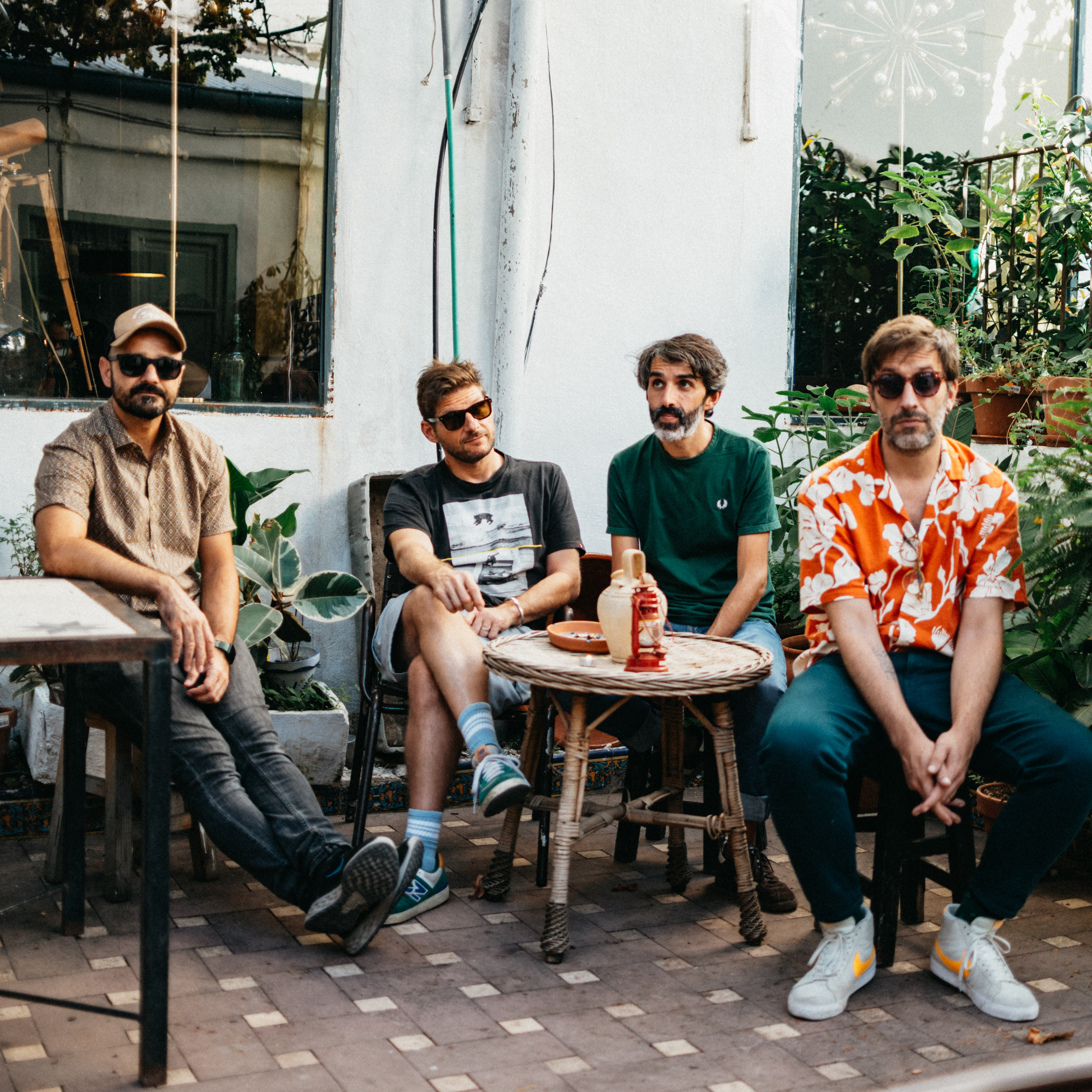
- Marchica in Córdoba, Spain, Fall 2023.

Background information
- Origin: Pozoblanco, Spain, Long Beach, CA
- Genres: Indie rock, lo-fi, rock, psychedelic rock
- Years active: 2020-present
- Labels: Mai Lei Bel∙Sweet Mary Records∙Shoreline Records
- Members: Pete Marchica; Antonio Jesús Moreno Sanchez; Miguelo Gómez Villar; Jamie Romero Gómez

Marchica is a Spanish-American indie rock band that formed in Pozoblanco, Spain in May 2021. Founding members include Pete Marchica (vocals, guitar and keyboards), Antonio Jesús Moreno Sanchez, Aka: El Ciento (drums and vocals), and Miguel Gomez Villar (bass). Jamie Romero Gomez (guitar) joined the band in November 2021. The band has toured mostly throughout the Andalucía region of Spain since releasing their debut studio album PED XING [pronounced: Pēd·Ching] on January 14, 2022.

== History ==
After a short stint living in the United Kingdom and Spain, singer/guitarist Pete Marchica met Antonio J. Moreno (illustrator and drummer of the Spanish indie rock band Algunos Hombres) outside of a bar just 2 weeks before moving back to his native Long Beach, CA in May 2017.

In the years that followed, Pete Marchica and A.J. Moreno Sanchez kept in contact via text messages and Snail-mail. During the COVID-19 pandemic of 2020, Pete Marchica began writing and recording the initial tracks for PED XING at Bennett Studios in Long Beach, CA. Upon hearing the early recordings of what would become their debut album, Antonio Jesus quickly made plans to start rehearsing for the recording of an EP which would contain songs previously written by Marchica himself. However, by June 2021, the band realized that the songs which came out of the early Escuela Taller Sessions were more than enough to produce a full-length album. The album is bookended by the title tracks, Ped Xing Pt. 1 and Ped Xing Pt. 2. Both are melodic, acoustic recordings that one journalist described as a "transatlantic pedestrian crossing littered with cheap beer, sunflower seeds, Spanish olives and psilocybin." On December 31, 2023, Austrian based record label Mai Lei Bel announced that Marchica had officially become part of its family of artists.

== Recording and production ==
The recording and engineering for PED XING was very much a Frankenstein project, in that pieces of tracks recorded in Long Beach, CA were spliced together with pieces recorded in Málaga, Spain and Pozoblanco. The album was mixed by both A.J. Moreno Sanchez and Pete Marchica, and eventually mastered in Berlin, Germany by Cem Oral, who in the past has worked with such artists as Nine inch Nails, Wu-Tang Clan, Black Eyed Peas, stereo Total and Gwen Stefani. In March 2023, the band recorded their second studio album in Seville, Spain at La Mina Studios, with producer/engineer Rául Pérez. The album, titled "Walter's Walk", is forecast to be released by the end of the year. The record was also mastered once again by Cem Oral of Jammin Masters in Berlin.

== Distribution ==
In the fall of 2021 the band had approached a number of record labels to sign and help with distribution, including Drag City, Matador, Sub Pop and Domino, but all declined. It wasn't until Andalusian underground darlings Sweet Mary Records and Happy Place Records heard the unmastered cuts, when they decided to help produce a vinyl edition for release in Europe. Subsequently, Long Beach, California based label Shoreline Records also helped produce and distribute the American release of PED XING. A significant amount of money was also raised for the production from friends and family via online crowdfunding efforts.

On September 29, 2023, Marchica released their first single from the forthcoming sophomore album titled, "Walter's Walk", which critics say is a great leap in character and sound, in comparison to their previous work. The single titled, "Tilted Whirl", is a "robust plea against political hypocrisy and the decadence of the West in a world where freedom of expression is a dangerous game, a portentous Sabbathian dart, of pop soul and psychedelic craftsmanship, to which the band's singer, Pete Marchica, produced the video for. Additional tracks on the record such as, "OCD SoundSystems", "Unknown Terrain", "Oil & Water", and "This Town", are said to have heavy Tom Verlaine and Neil Young influences, confirming them as one of the more interesting acts to emerge recently in Andalucía.

On July 12, 2024, Marchica released the second single called "OCD Soundsystems" from their forthcoming album, along with a music video. Their second album was released two weeks later July 26, 2024, on Austrian Indie record label, "Mai Lei Bel."

== Reception ==
Marchica's music has been described as the lyrics of Jonathan Richman and Mark E. Smith, with the music of Sebadoh and Neil Young. Upon the release of PED XING, Bob Nastanovich of Pavement stated, "Marchica is a clever lot. I have faith that when they are exposed that people will dig their action.” The Spanish online music outlet Woody Jagger put PED XING on its list of two dozen records you must hear in 2022. The band also does not limit their versatility when it comes to instrumentation, as is heard on the song Crystal Seas, which features obscure percussion, keyboards, and a viola.

== Additional releases ==
On July 4, 2022, Marchica released a cover of the song "Frontwards" from Stockton, California-based indie rock band Pavement's 1992 EP titled, "Watery, Domestic". On October 6, 2022, Marchica released an original song titled "Ellie", which will appeared on the compilation record from Andalusian indie label Grabaciones Bonicas titled, Andalucía Bajo Tierra. The compilation features music from Bazofia & Miguelito García, of the band Derby Motoreta’s Burrito Kachimba, as well as other Spanish underground bands such as Elemento Deserto. The compilation was released on October 28, 2022, in a limited edition colored cassette format. On December 2, 2023, Marchica performed a new original song from the forthcoming ¡Explosión Colectiva! Vol. 2 compilation record, titled, "Shanghai Daughter" as well as a cover of the song "End of Century Club" by 90's indie rock band Goodbye Planet.
