= Spring Collection =

EP by Luke Vibert and BJ Cole
- Released: October 31, 2000
- Recorded: 2000
- Label: Cooking Vinyl

If you were looking for the song by The Vapors called "Spring Collection", see here.

Spring Collaboration is a collaboration EP by Luke Vibert and BJ Cole.

== Track listing ==
=== CD version ===
1. "Swing Lite - Alright"
2. "Aahfternoon"
3. "Party Animal (Mr. Scruff's Beats Mix)"
  - Remix: Mr. Scruff
4. "Swing Lite - Alright (Heavy Swing Version by Metrophonics)"
  - Remix: Metrophonics

=== 12" vinyl version ===
Side A

1. "Aahfternoon"

Side B

1. "Swing Lite - Alright (Heavy Swing Version by Metrophonics)"
  - Remix: Metrophonics
2. "Party Animal (Mr. Scruff's Beats Mix)"
  - Remix - Mr. Scruff
