= Drum 'n' Bass 'n' Steel =

Studio album by Luke Vibert & BJ Cole
- Released: December 1999
- Genre: Electronica

Drum 'n' Bass 'n' Steel is a 12" vinyl release of a collaboration between Luke Vibert and BJ Cole.

== Track listing ==
Side A

1. "Drum 'n' Bass 'n' Steel" - 5:46

Side B

1. "Tom 'n' Us" - 4:04
  - Bass guitar: Tom Jenkinson
2. "Party Animal" - 4:00
