= Drum 'n' Bass for Papa =

Studio album by Plug
- Released: 29 July 1996
- Genre: Drum and bass, electronica
- Length: 79:43
- Label: Blue Angel
- Producer: Plug

Plug chronology
| Plug 3 (1995) | Drum 'n' Bass for Papa (1996) | Me & Mr. Sutton (1997) |

Alternative cover
- Special Edition version cover

Professional ratings
Review scores
| Source | Rating |
|---|---|
| AllMusic (Original version) | 4.5/5 stars |
| AllMusic (Nothing Records version) | 5/5 stars |
| Muzik | 5/5 stars |
| The New Rolling Stone Album Guide | 4/5 stars |
| Pitchfork | 9.5/10 |
| Spin | 8/10 |

Drum 'n' Bass for Papa is a studio album by Luke Vibert, released under the alias Plug. It was originally released by Blue Planet Recordings in 1996, and in 1997 on Trent Reznor's Nothing Records with the bonus addition of Vibert's previous three Plug EPs.

NME listed it as the 33rd best album of 1996. Writing for Chicago Reader, Peter Margasak listed it as the 9th best album of 1996.

== Release ==
Originally released by Blue Planet Recordings in 1996, the album has gone through several different releases.

The first was a CD release with an additional bonus disc, titled Drum 'n' Bass for Papa + Special Edition CD, released in 1997. It had different cover art and the discs were colored dark blue instead of the original sepia tone.

The album was released again on Trent Reznor's label Nothing Records on 9 September 1997. It was a double album on CD, which included the songs from the previously released EPs. This version of the album had the same cover as the Special Edition version but changed "Special Edition CD" to "Plug EP's 1, 2 & 3" for the title. It was released under the title Drum 'n' Bass for Papa + Plug EP's 1, 2 & 3. The other difference in this version was that the import included the track "The Life of the Mind", which wasn't included on the album due to problems with a sample clearance.

== Track listing ==
All tracks written by Luke Vibert.

Original version
| No. | Title | Length |
|---|---|---|
| 1. | "Me & Mr Jones" | 7:07 |
| 2. | "Drum 'n' Bass for Papa" | 7:20 |
| 3. | "Cut" | 7:18 |
| 4. | "Feelings" | 9:15 |
| 5. | "I Freak Techniques" | 7:29 |
| 6. | "The Life of the Mind" | 8:10 |
| 7. | "Subtle (In Your Face)" | 8:15 |
| 8. | "Delicious" | 7:43 |
| 9. | "DBC" | 8:56 |
| 10. | "Maker of All" | 8:10 |

Special Edition version bonus disc
| No. | Title | Length |
|---|---|---|
| 1. | "Cut ('97 Remix)" | 8:07 |
| 2. | "Brave Lick" | 8:17 |
| 3. | "Versatile" | 7:58 |
| 4. | "Tuff Rinse" | 10:31 |
| 5. | "Crib Funk" | 4:52 |

Nothing Records version
| No. | Title | Length |
|---|---|---|
| 1. | "Me & Mr. Jones" | 7:07 |
| 2. | "Drum 'n' Bass for Papa" | 7:20 |
| 3. | "Cut ('97 Remix)" | 8:02 |
| 4. | "Feelings" | 9:15 |
| 5. | "I Freak Techniques" | 7:30 |
| 6. | "Delicious" | 7:43 |
| 7. | "DBC" | 8:56 |
| 8. | "Maker of All" | 8:09 |
| 9. | "A Subtle Blend" | 8:35 |

Nothing Records version bonus disc
| No. | Title | Length |
|---|---|---|
| 1. | "6.07" | 6:02 |
| 2. | "7.44" | 7:42 |
| 3. | "7.10" | 7:11 |
| 4. | "3.41" | 3:42 |
| 5. | "Military Jazz" | 7:37 |
| 6. | "Pitch Bender" | 5:12 |
| 7. | "Cheesy (Gigolo Mix)" | 4:57 |
| 8. | "Cheesy (Amen Mix)" | 4:58 |
| 9. | "Brave Lick" | 8:20 |
| 10. | "Tuf Rinse" | 7:58 |
| 11. | "Versatile" | 10:29 |
