= Ingmar Koch =

German musician

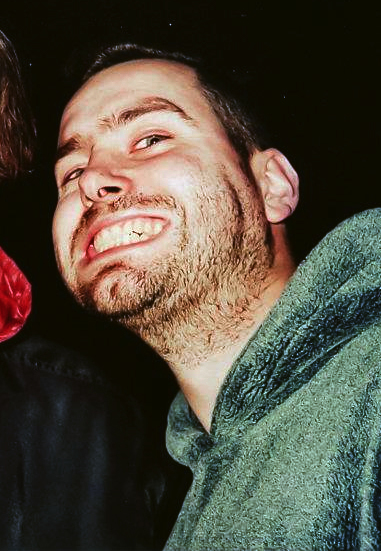

Background information
- Also known as: Dr. Walker
- Genres: Ambient techno, acid house, noise, experimental breaks
- Occupations: Musician, Producer, Film Producer, Multi Media Artist
- Instruments: Electronic instruments and computers
- Years active: 1980–present
- Labels: Harvest, Analog Records, EMF, Socket Records, Force Inc, Sm:)e Communications, Mille Plateaux, Djungle Fever, Propulsion285, Telepathic Bubblebath, XXC3, Rising High, Edge Records, Direct Drive, lsb27, BMG, Sony, Kompakt, Kreisel, Structure, Auftrieb, Blue, Monotone, Space Teddy, Intergalactic Research Institute For Sound

Ingmar Koch (also known by his pseudonym Dr. Walker) is a German musician, producer and label owner in the field of Electronic Music. He was a member of more than 50 different techno music projects, such as Air Liquide (with Cem Oral), Khan & Walker (with Can Oral), Global Electronic Network (with Can Oral), Pierrot Premier (with Thomas Thorn), Lovecore (with Wolfgang Voigt) and Rei$$dorf Force (with Jörg Burger, Freddy Fresh, M.Flux, Thee Joker, L Nino among others).

== Biography ==
Koch started to produce electronic music age 14. First record release with 16. In 1991, he founded a recording studio in Frankfurt with Cem Oral, with whom he shortly afterwards formed the project Air Liquide with. In 1992, their first EP, titled Neue Frankfurter Elektronik Schule, was issued on the Cologne based record label "Blue". In 1991 Koch, Oral, Joerg Burger and Wolfgang Voigt founded the acid techno label "Structure". In 1993, Koch formed the labels XXC3 and Dj.ungle Fever (which is still active until today).

The same year and following years, he recorded numerous solo releases and collaborations with artists such as Wolfgang Voigt, Biochip C., Frank Heiss, Thomas Thorn, Jörg Burger, Electric Indigo, Holger Czukay, ADSX, Wulfmanson, Mary Susan Applegate, Craig Anderton, Omsk information, Fabian Stall, FM Einheit, Andreas Thein and Triple R. With Can Oral he published, among other monikers, as Khan & Walker and Gizz TV & Walker.

Koch is co-founder of Delirium Cologne, which was later renamed to Kompakt.

2014, he started the art & music television projects Psychedelic Kitchen and lsb TV in cooperation with the Cologne video artist Uli Sigg and Berlinbased TV and Radiostation Alex Berlin.

Also in 2015, he got involved in several cooperations with the art gallery Neu West Berlin and Riga based Synthesizer manufacturer Erica Synths.

In 2017, Koch opened the chili-farm "SPX27" and in cooperation with the Berlin club and art-location "Maze.Berlin" the experimental musicbar and video art gallery "Liquid Sky Berlin - #lsb02".

In 2023 start of Liquid Sky d-vices, a label for experimental hardware and software music instruments, made in Santana da Serra, Portugal.

Koch releases 2025 the probably biggest music album in the history of music: "527 - Da Dark Dada-ist" on DJungle Fever with 550 previously unreleased tracks and over 27 hours of playtime.

Also in 2025 relaunches Koch with biz partner Cornel Hecht the legendary German synthesizer brand PPG with new versions of classic PPG hardware instruments and synth modules.

== Selected discography ==
=== Studio albums ===
- 1994: Global Electronic Network (=Khan & Walker) – Rolleiflex / Weltron (Mille Plateaux)
- 1994: Global Electronic Network (=Khan & Walker) – Rolleiflex / Timesquare (Mille Plateaux)
- 1995: Khan & Walker – Radiowaves (Harvest)
- 1994: Global Electronic Network (=Khan & Walker) feat. 4E– Electronic Desert (Mille Plateaux)
- 1996: Khan & Walker – Schleichfahrt (Disko B)
- 1997: Holger Czukay vs. Dr. Walker – Clash (Sideburn Recordings)
- 1997: Khan & Walker – Empire State Building (Harvest)
- 1997: Khan & Walker – Radiowaves II (Harvest)
- 1998: Dr. Walker & M. Flux – 16 Lovesongs for the Spice Girls (Harvest)
- 2000: Dr. Walker – Escape From Cologne (Tone Casualties)
- 2014: Adsx. Sense. Dr. Walker – MK-Naomi Sessions (XXC3 / Liquid Sky Berlin)
- 2014: Khan & Walker – Empire State Building (I Am Single)
- 2018: Omsk Information & Dr Walker – Mescaline Muzzikkk (Bastl Instruments)
- 2020: Omsk Information & Dr Walker – Escape From Treptow (lsb27 / liquid sky artistcollective)
- 2020: Omsk Information & Dr Walker – The Liquid Sky Berlin Sessions (Djungle Fever)
- 2021: Daniel Katzenstab & Dr Walker – Johnny Cash Backwards (lsb27 / Liquid Sky artistcollective)
- 2021: Daniel Katzenstab & Dr Walker – Shark Traxx 2027 (DJungle Fever / Liquid Sky artistcollective)
- 2023: Wulfmanson & Dr Walker – Asbest! Tigerpack Mixes (DJungle Fever / Liquid Sky artistcollective)
- 2024: Dr Walker – U Haft - rerelease (DJungle Fever / Liquid Sky artistcollective)
- 2024: Daniel Katzenstab & Dr Walker – The Alientejo Files (DJungle Fever / Liquid Sky artistcollective)
- 2024: Daniel Katzenstab & Dr Walker – Noise.Berlin 2024 (DJungle Fever / Liquid Sky artistcollective)
- 2024: Wulfmanson, L Nino & Dr Walker – Timestretch Paradise - rerelease (DJungle Fever / Liquid Sky artistcollective)
- 2024: Thomas F Thorn & Dr Walker – Pierrot Premier - rerelease (DJungle Fever / Liquid Sky artistcollective)
- 2024: Thomas F Thorn & Dr Walker – Vermona - rerelease (DJungle Fever / Liquid Sky artistcollective)
- 2024: Dr Walker – Freddy Asked Me (Analog Records)
- 2025: Dr Walker – 527 - Da Dark DaDa-ist (DJungle Fever / Liquid Sky artistcollective)
- 2025: Dr. NoiseM & Dr Walker – Liquid Sky Berlin Ambient Session (Live) (Dr. NoiseM Tapes - clear vinyl dubplate limited edition)
- 2025: Dr. NoiseM & Dr Walker – Liquid Sky Berlin Ambient Session (Live) (DJungle Fever / Liquid Sky artistcollective - digital release)
- 2025: Sara Bernett & Dr Walker – GLITHc-to-Skull (Djungle Fever / Liquid Sky artistcollective - vinyl lathe cut / cd limited editions)
- 2025: Sara Bernett & Dr Walker – GLITHc-to-Skull (Djungle Fever / Liquid Sky artistcollective - digital release)
- 2025: Maritta Sonnenschein & Dr Walker – Vinyl 01 (Djungle Fever / Liquid Sky artistcollective - vinyl lathe cut / cd limited editions)
- 2025: Dr Walker – DaDa WaXXX01 (Djungle Fever / Liquid Sky artistcollective - vinyl lathe cut / cd limited editions)
- 2025: Dr Walker – DaDa WaXXX01 (Djungle Fever / Liquid Sky artistcollective - digital release)
- 2025: Daniel Katzenstab & Dr Walker – Alientejo Mysteries (Djungle Fever / Liquid Sky artistcollective - digital release)
- 2025: Dr Walker – Timestretch Paradise 2027 (Djungle Fever / Liquid Sky artistcollective - digital release)
- 2025: Dr Walker – Timestretch Twilight Zone (Djungle Fever / Liquid Sky artistcollective - digital release)
- 2025: Thomas Thorn & Dr Walker – Vermona (Djungle Fever / Liquid Sky artistcollective - digital re-release)
- 2025: Dr Walker – no/ver/mona 2027 (Djungle Fever / Liquid Sky artistcollective - digital release)
- 2025: Thomas Thorn & Dr Walker – Pierrot Premier - Orange Clouds Over Battery Park (Djungle Fever / Liquid Sky artistcollective - digital re-release)
- 2025: Wulfmanson, L Nino, Craig Anderton & Dr Walker – Timestretch Paradise (Djungle Fever / Liquid Sky artistcollective - digital re-release)
- 2026: Dr Walker – Time Stretch Spaz (Djungle Fever / Liquid Sky artistcollective - digital release)
- 2026: Noise.Berlin – Haunted Pulse - Abstract Pulse - Hypnotic Pulse (Djungle Fever / Liquid Sky artistcollective - digital release)
- 2026: Noise.Berlin – Luftschloesser Aus Nervengas (Djungle Fever / Liquid Sky artistcollective - digital release)
- 2026: Dr Walker – Do You Love Me (Djungle Fever / Liquid Sky artistcollective - digital release / limited colored vinyl)
- 2026: Noise.Berlin – kurzwellen dieb (Djungle Fever / Liquid Sky artistcollective - digital release)

=== Singles and EPs ===
- 1993: Khan & Walker – Biogas (Propulsion 285)
- 1993: Walker – DJ.Ungle Fever (Dj.ungle Fever)
- 1993: Mike Ink & Walker – Lovecore E.P. (Structure)
- 1993: Walker / Biochip C. – Shark Volume Two (Dj.ungle Fever)
- 1993: Walker – Illegal EP (Luv Traxx)
- 1993: Biochip C. / Walker – Red Light District Vol. II (Dj.ungle Fever)
- 1993: Walker – Drummatix Drop Outs (Communism Records)
- 1993: Walker – The Sunshine E.P. (Dj.ungle Fever)
- 1994: Black One – Electronic Percussion E.P. (Force Inc. Music Works)
- 1994: Gizz TV & Walker – Spread / Invasion of the Bassface (Dj.ungle Fever)
- 1994: Gizz TV & Walker – Live at the Electro (Dj.ungle Fever)
- 1994: Walker – Business Card E.P. (Dj.ungle Fever)
- 1994: Walker – U-Haft EP (Dj.ungle Fever)
- 1994: Walker – Astroland EP (Direct Drive)
- 1994: Mike Ink & Walker – Lovecore II (Not on Label)
- 1994: Jammin' Unit vs. Walker – Money Talk$! (Dj.ungle Fever)
- 1994: Walker – Redlight District Vol. 3 (Dj.ungle Fever)
- 1994: Walker – Don't Fuck With Cologne (Dj.ungle Fever)
- 1994: Electric Indigo & Walker – Vol. 11 (Dj.ungle Fever)
- 1994: Walker – Schrei Nach Liebe (Force Inc. Music Works)
- 1994: Biochip C., Jammin' Unit & Walker – Shark-Trax (Rising High Records)
- 1995: Black One / Bizz O.D. – Little Funky Jazz Piano / Wo? (Dj.ungle Fever)
- 1995: Black One – The New EP (Temple Records N.Y.C. Inc.)
- 1995: Black One – Digital Percussion (Temple Records N.Y.C. Inc.)
- 1995: Freddie Fresh vs. Dr. Walker – DJ Fresh Analog U.S. Vs. Walker Cologne DJ.Ungle Fever Germany (Analog Records USA)
- 1995: Gizz TV & Walker – Little Lonesome Astronaut (Force Inc. Music Works)
- 1995: Khan & Walker – Empire State Building (XXC3)
- 1995: Walker & Triple R – Aufraeumen! (XXC3)
- 1996: Gizz TV & Walker – Super 8 – 001 (Super 8)
- 1996: Walker & Frank Heiss – Flash Dancers on Acid (Sm:)e Communications)
- 1997: Dr. Walker – Damenwahl! (Eat Raw)
- 1997: Dr. Walker – Nuthin But An "E" Thang (Syncom Productionz)
- 1997: Dr. Walker – Dr Walker's Psychedelic Kitchen Vol.1 (Serotonin)
- 1997: Gizz TV & Walker – Spalt (Acid Orange)
- 1998: Dr. Walker & M. Flux – Present Some Cockrockin Beatz (Harvest)
- 1999: Khan & Walker – Simplex (Harvest)
- 2000: Dr. Walker – Escape From Cologne (Tone Casualties)
- 2004: Dr. Walker and Wulfmanson and Lorentz Hecker – Soundtrack From "The Car" (Dj.ungle Fever)
- 2004: Dr. Walker and Wulfmanson – Fischteich EP (Dj.ungle Fever)
- 2005: Rob Acid / Toktok / Wulfmanson / Dr. Walker / Sanomat – Djungle Fever Looopz (DJ.Ungle Fever)
- 2005: Dr. Walker – Asbest Volume 1 (Dj.ungle Fever)
- 2013: Dr. Walker – Spontane Selbstentflamunkk (Dj.ungle Fever)
- 2013: Adsx. Paul Heimweh. Dr. Walker – Telepathic Bubblevinyl (XXC3 / Liquid Sky Berlin)
- 2013: Dr. Walker – Hoch Die Tassen – Ab Dafuer – Remixes (Dj.ungle Fever)
- 2016: Omsk Information & Dr. Walker – Psychedelic Kitchen Berlin 2016 (Subsonic Records)
- 2016: Omsk Information & Dr. Walker – Only Here (Subsonic Records)
- 2016: Omsk Information & Dr. Walker – Only Here (Ninja Jamm)
- 2016: Monsieur Fleury & Dr. Walker – Tapearchive (Telepathic Bubblebath)
- 2016: Monsieur Fleury, Daniel Katzenstab, Coldcut & Dr. Walker – Industrial Sky (Ninja Jamm)
- 2019: Dr Walker – Businesscard Ep (Holding Hand Records)
- 2020: Omsk Information & Dr. Walker – Drubble Ep (Dj.ungle Fever)
- 2020: Khan & Walker – Schleichfahrt rmxd & rmstrd (Dj.ungle Fever)
- 2021: Dr Walker – Redlight District vol IV Remastered (Dj.ungle Fever)
- 2021: Dr Walker – Live At MICA 2021 (lsb27 / Liquid Sky artistcollective)
- 2022: Mary Susan Applegate, Wulfmanson & Dr Walker – Fish (Djungle Fever / Liquid Sky artistcollective)
- 2022: Mary Susan Applegate, Wulfmanson & Dr Walker – We Are Phuture (Djungle Fever / Liquid Sky artistcollective)
- 2023: Dr Walker – Dimensional Drift - Part 1 (Djungle Fever / Liquid Sky artistcollective)
- 2023: MFlux & Dr Walker – Back 2 Spacerock - rerelease (Djungle Fever / Liquid Sky artistcollective)
- 2023: MFlux & Dr Walker – Samstag Morgen Hangover - rerelease (Djungle Fever / Liquid Sky artistcollective)
- 2023: Wulfmanson & Dr Walker – Karpfen - Eifel Fischteich Mix (Djungle Fever / Liquid Sky artistcollective)
- 2023: Daniel Katzenstab & Dr Walker – Johnny In The Club (Djungle Fever / Liquid Sky artistcollective)
- 2023: MFlux & Dr Walker – Back 2 Spacerock - rerelease (Djungle Fever / Liquid Sky artistcollective)
- 2023: Andreas Thein, Wulfmanson & Dr Walker – Healthy In America (Djungle Fever / Liquid Sky artistcollective)
- 2024: Dr Walker – We Are Running Lo On Brainz 01 (Djungle Fever / Liquid Sky artistcollective)
- 2024: Dr Walker – We Are Running Lo On Brainz 03 (Djungle Fever / Liquid Sky artistcollective)
- 2024: Dr Walker – Fog Fog Fog - Part 3 (Djungle Fever / Liquid Sky artistcollective)
- 2024: Dr Walker – Dada Disco - Disco Dancer (Djungle Fever / Liquid Sky artistcollective)
- 2024: Dr Walker – Ueber Die Klinge Springen (Djungle Fever / Liquid Sky artistcollective)
- 2024: Dr Walker – The World Can Kiss My Ass (Djungle Fever / Liquid Sky artistcollective)
- 2024: Dr Walker – A Sad Song From Alientejo (Djungle Fever / Liquid Sky artistcollective)
- 2024: Dr Walker – God Is A 909 Bassdrum part 1 - 4 (Djungle Fever / Liquid Sky artistcollective)
- 2024: Daniel Katzenstab & Dr Walker – We Got Carried Away (Djungle Fever / Liquid Sky artistcollective)
- 2024: Daniel Katzenstab & Dr Walker – UFO System Jam 01 (Djungle Fever / Liquid Sky artistcollective)
- 2025: Dr Walker feat Maritta Sonnenschein – I See You I Feel You I Delete You (Djungle Fever / Liquid Sky artistcollective)
- 2025: Dr Walker feat Maritta Sonnenschein – Its Written In Your Face (Djungle Fever / Liquid Sky artistcollective)
- 2025: Dr Walker feat Maritta Sonnenschein – Ein Wesen Aus Vanillecreme (Djungle Fever / Liquid Sky artistcollective)
- 2025: Dr Walker feat Maritta Sonnenschein – Are We Famous Yet? (Djungle Fever / Liquid Sky artistcollective)
- 2025: Dr Walker feat Maritta Sonnenschein – Schwarz Weiss (Djungle Fever / Liquid Sky artistcollective)
- 2025: Dr Walker – Im Alltaeglichen Irrsinn Fest Verwurzelt (Djungle Fever / Liquid Sky artistcollective)
- 2025: Dr Walker – October Clouds 27 (Djungle Fever / Liquid Sky artistcollective)
- 2025: Dr Walker – Alientejo Minimal (Djungle Fever / Liquid Sky artistcollective)
- 2026: Dr Walker – I m On That Table Now (Djungle Fever / Liquid Sky artistcollective)
- 2026: Dr Walker – Big Energies (my heart was taken by you) (Djungle Fever / Liquid Sky artistcollective)
- 2026: Dr Walker feat Sara Bernett – Alientejo Summer Is Comming (Djungle Fever / Liquid Sky artistcollective)
- 2026: Dr Walker – 100 Years Tinfoil Hats (Djungle Fever / Liquid Sky artistcollective)
- 2026: Dr Walker & Wulfmanson feat Mary S Applegate – Do You Love Me (Djungle Fever / Liquid Sky artistcollective)

Please check Discogs for a more complete discography.
