= Mary Susan Applegate =

American songwriter, poet and lyricist

- Born: Mary Susan Applegate; May 2, 1955 (age 71)
- Origin: United States
- Genres: Pop, Rock
- Occupation: Lyricist

Mary Susan Applegate (born May 2, 1955) is an American songwriter, poet and lyricist who lives in Frankfurt am Main, Germany.

She rose to prominence in 1984 with the lyrics to the multi-platinum hit "The Power of Love", and has since written songs for and co-written songs with multiple singers, and her songs have been constant part of the Eurovision Song Contest in recent years.

== Career ==
Applegate is best known for her contribution to the song "The Power of Love". In 1985, the Jennifer Rush original took the number one position in the UK Singles Chart, remaining there for 5 weeks.

In 1994 the song became Celine Dion's first number one in the US Billboard charts, staying at the top for four weeks. Celine Dion's version of "The Power of Love" won Applegate the ASCAP Pop Award for "Most Performed Song" in the United States and was nominated for the Grammy Award for Best Female Pop Vocal Performance, American Music Award for Favorite Pop/Rock Single, two Billboard Music Awards for Hot 100 Single of the Year and Hot Adult Contemporary Single of the Year, and for the Juno Award for Single of the Year.

Shirley Bassey, Andrea Bocelli, Laura Branigan and Air Supply are among many world-renowned artists that covered the song.

Applegate went on to write various hit songs for:

Milli Vanilli ("Girl You Know It's True"), No Mercy ("Please Don't Go"), La Bouche, Bad Boys Blue ("You're a Woman", Love Is No Crime album), Boney M. ("Young, Free and Single"), Banaroo, Bonnie Bianco, Jennifer Rush, Far Corporation, Aaron Carter („Crazy Little Party Girl“), Liberty ("Thinking It Over") and Le Click.

She worked with:

Nena, Udo Lindenberg, Dieter Falk, Tic Tac Toe, Funky Diamonds, Culture Beat (Metamorphosis) Yoomiii, Jazzamor, Cascada, Pur, Erkan Aki, Pete Seeger and Gotthard (Lipservice album). Earlier work includes "Do You Wanna" from the "1st album" (1985) of Modern Talking co-written with Dieter Bohlen.

Applegate also left a footprint in the German Pop- and Schlager world, writing for acts like:

Thomas Anders, Nino de Angelo, Matthias Reim Michelle and Helene Fischer.

Applegate, who only wrote English lyrics during her career, began writing German lyrics for the first time in 2020. Her debut was on the Wolfgang Petry album "Auf das Leben", which was released in September 2021 and ranked at number 2 in the German music charts. Further collaboration with Petry took place on the Stark wie wir album, which reached No. 4 in the German music charts in March 2023.

She also composed some poems for songs by the most famous Portuguese girl band of the 80s, Doce. Songs such as "For the Love of Conchita", "Starlight" or "Stepping Stone".

== Eurovision Song Contest ==
Applegate won 2nd place together with Victor Drobysh in the 2012 Eurovision Song Contest with the Russian entry "Party for Everybody" performed by Buranovskiye Babushki.

Other ESC entries written by Applegate include Natalia Podolskaya's "Nobody Hurt No One" in 2005 for Russia (position 15 in the final) and Ivan's "Help You Fly" in 2016 for Belarus.

In 2019 Serhat sang "Say Na Na Na", a song partially written by Applegate, for San Marino. It was only the second time San Marino made it to the grand final.

== Poetry and vocals ==
Applegate contributed poetry, lyrics and vocals to the German experimental electronic band Air Liquide, composed of Ingmar Koch (a.k.a. "Dr Walker") and Cem Oral (a.k.a. "Jammin' Unit"). The band was formed in 1991 in Frankfurt am Main, Germany.

Her vocals on Air Liquide's "This is not a Mind Trip" was used for the opening of the 1994 Love Parade in Berlin.

== Screenplays ==
Applegate collaborated with Frank Farian and Michael Stark on the storyboard for the Daddy Cool musical which opened in London's West End at the Shaftesbury Theatre in 2006.

She currently is working on a biopic screenplay with Cine Golden Eagle Award winner, director and producer Sven Fleck.

== Short stories ==
Further contributions can be heard on The Pete Wolf Band album 2084, where beside lyrics, she also co-penned 14 short stories with Pete Wolf.

== Awards ==
=== Grammy Awards ===
"The Power of Love", (Celine Dion), Best Female Pop Vocal Performance (1994) - Nominated

=== American Music Award ===
"The Power of Love", (Celine Dion), Favorite Pop/Rock Song (1995) - Nominated

=== ASCAP ===
"The Power of Love", (Celine Dion), Most Performed Song. (1994)

=== Billboard Music Awards ===
"The Power of Love", (Celine Dion), Top Hot 100 Song. (1994)

"The Power of Love", (Celine Dion), Hot Adult Contemporary number one of 1994. (1994)

=== Juno Award ===
"The Power of Love", (Celine Dion), Single Of The Year. (1995) - Nominated
