= Classid Trax =

EP by The Ace Of Clubs
- Released: 2002
- Genre: Acid house
- Label: Paperplane SV303
- Producer: Luke Vibert

Classid Trax is an EP by Luke Vibert under the alias "The Ace Of Clubs". The album was released on a 12" vinyl as a promo. The titled Classid Trax is a play on the words "classic acid tracks". In March 2007, Paperline Records made these tracks available as mp3 downloads . Bleep.com is selling the album in mp3 and flac formats.

== Track listing ==
Side A:

1. "128.5" - 5:29
2. "124.2" - 3:57

Side B:

1. "125.8" - 4:09
2. "133.6" - 5:26
