= YosepH =

Studio album by Luke Vibert
- Released: 13 October 2003
- Genre: Acid techno
- Length: 51:28
- Label: Warp
- Producer: Luke Vibert

Luke Vibert chronology
Stop the Panic (2000)	YosepH (2003)	Lover's Acid (2005)

Professional ratings
Review scores
Source	Rating
AllMusic	4.5/5 stars
Almost Cool	7.25/10
MusicOMH	favorable
No Ripchord	7/10
Pitchfork	7.3/10
PopMatters	favorable
Stylus Magazine	B−

YosepH is the second studio album by Luke Vibert under his own name, released in 2003 on Warp. It was originally shipped from Warpmart with a sheet of glow-in-the-dark stickers. The album is dedicated to the memories of Peter Walker and Rob Mitchell.

== Critical reception ==
Alex Linhardt of Pitchfork gave YosepA a 7.3 out of 10, commenting that "The album makes a conscious attempt to burrow into the glitzy, wondrous world of classic acid house and the infamously resonant and bouncy modulations of the Roland TB-303, a machine basically responsible for most of the house and electro of the last thirty years." Simon Evans of MusicOMH said, "the album has a decidedly retro feel, something that is enhanced by Vibert's use throughout of analogue-era synths, complete with all their idiosyncratic electronic beeps and burps."

Nick Southall of Stylus Magazine gave YosepH a grade of B−, describing it as "one of the most stupidly danceable albums of the year." Patrick Sisson of PopMatters said, "YosepH shows that Vibert continues to make solid music that is worth nodding your head to."

== Track listing ==
No.	Title	Length
1.	"Liptones"	4:01
2.	"Synthax"	4:32
3.	"Freak Time Baby"	2:54
4.	"Countdown"	3:32
5.	"Nok Tup"	4:05
6.	"I Love Acid"	4:19
7.	"Ambalek"	2:52
8.	"Acidisco"	5:08
9.	"Stan D'infamy"	3:16
10.	"YosepH"	3:33
11.	"Slowfast"	4:30
12.	"Snapdance"	4:13
13.	"Harmonic"	4:33

Japanese edition bonus track
No.	Title	Length
14.	"Arcade Acid"	4:32

== Charts ==
Chart	Peak position
UK Independent Albums (OCC)	34
