= Musipal =

Studio album by Wagon Christ
- Released: 6 March 2001
- Genre: Electronic
- Length: 62:58
- Label: Ninja Tune
- Producer: Wagon Christ

Wagon Christ chronology
Tally Ho! (1998)	Musipal (2001)	Sorry I Make You Lush (2004)

Professional ratings
Review scores
Source	Rating
AllMusic	4/5 stars
The Guardian	4/5 stars
NME	3.5/5 stars
Pitchfork	8.0/10

Musipal is a studio album by Luke Vibert, released under the alias Wagon Christ. It was released in 2001 on Ninja Tune.

== Critical reception ==
Tony Naylor of NME gave the album 3.5 stars out of 5, commenting that Musipal "amply illustrates Vibert's ability to make wild leaps of musical imagination." Spencer Owen of Pitchfork gave the album an 8.0 out of 10, saying, "There are plenty of flavors for anyone on Musipal, although the record as a whole may be too diverse for some, if that's possible."

== Track listing ==
No.	Title	Length
1.	"The Premise"	3:28
2.	"Bend Over"	4:46
3.	"Tomach"	4:31
4.	"Thick Stew"	7:47
5.	"Natural Suction"	7:33
6.	"Musipal"	4:00
7.	"It Is Always Now, All of It Is Now"	4:55
8.	"Receiver"	3:24
9.	"Boney L"	2:01
10.	"Cris Chana"	4:50
11.	"Tomorrow Acid"	3:42
12.	"Step to the Music"	6:30
13.	"Perkission"	5:31

== Charts ==
Chart	Peak position
UK Independent Albums (OCC)	31
