= Nephology (album) =

Studio album by Air Liquide
- Released: 1994
- Genre: Electronic
- Length: 59:34 (DE); 76:04 (UK)
- Label: Blue Records (DE); Rising High Records (UK)

Air Liquide chronology
Air Liquide (1993)	Nephology (1994)	If There Was No Gravity (1994)

Professional ratings
Review scores
Source	Rating
Allmusic	3/5 stars

Nephology is the second studio album by German electronic artists Air Liquide, which was released in 1994.

The German and UK releases of the record album contained different track listings.

== Track listing ==
=== German release ===
1. "Im Erlmeyer-Kolben Pt. I" – 2:19
2. "Semwave" – 7:00
3. "Die Reise im Teekessel 2" – 11:20
4. "Nephology" – 3:01
5. "Aurorabelt" – 3:08
6. "Kymea" – 5:02
7. "Stratus Static" – 8:10
8. "The Clouds Have Eyes" – 6:40
9. "Cassiopeia" – 5:01
10. "Sulfur Clouds" – 3:55
11. "Im Erlmeyer-Kolben Pt. II" – 3:58

=== UK release ===
1. "The Cloud" – 9:53
2. "Semiwave" – 7:03
3. "Die Reise Im Teekessel" – 11:32
4. "Nephology" – 3:02
5. "If There Was No Gravity" – 7:44
6. "Kymnea" – 5:09
7. "Sulfur Clouds" – 4:06
8. "Im Grlenmeyerkolben I" – 2:29
9. "Im Grlenmeyerkolben II" – 4:04
10. "Stratus Static" – 8:13
11. "Casiopeia" – 6:05
12. "The Clouds Have Eyes" – 6:44
