= Lover's Acid =

Studio album by Luke Vibert
- Released: 4 April 2005
- Genre: Acid breaks, IDM
- Length: 58:35
- Label: Planet Mu
- Producer: Luke Vibert

Luke Vibert chronology
YosepH (2003)	Lover's Acid (2005)	Chicago, Detroit, Redruth (2007)

Professional ratings
Review scores
Source	Rating
AllMusic	3.5/5 stars
Almost Cool	6.75/10
Pitchfork	7.5/10
PopMatters	4/10 stars
Tiny Mix Tapes	3.5/5 stars

Lover's Acid is the third studio album by techno artist Luke Vibert under his own name. It was released in 2005 on Planet Mu.

== Critical reception ==
Mark Richardson of Pitchfork gave the album a 7.5 of 10, commenting that Lover's Acid "reveals Vibert as a producer with a keen sense of musical humor and an abiding interest in funkiness". Mike Schiller of PopMatters gave the album four stars out of 10, saying, "The 12 tracks of Lover's Acid would have been better left as vinyl-only collector's items, for at least then, they would have carried with them some intrinsic value".

== Track listing ==
No.	Title	Length
1.	"Funky Acid Stuff"	4:41
2.	"Cash 'n' Carry Acid"	4:23
3.	"Homewerk"	4:34
4.	"Gwithian"	6:58
5.	"Prick Tat"	3:25
6.	"Analord"	4:54
7.	"Lover's Acid"	5:12
8.	"Acid 2000"	3:43
9.	"Come on Chaos"	5:27
10.	"Orch Garage"	3:43
11.	"Dirty Fucker"	4:41
12.	"Flyover"	6:54
