= Amen Andrews vs. Spac Hand Luke =

Studio album by Amen Andrews and Spac Hand Luke
- Released: 23 June 2006
- Genre: Electronic
- Length: 50:19
- Label: Rephlex Records
- Producer: Luke Vibert

Professional ratings
Review scores
Source	Rating
AllMusic	3.5/5 stars
Brainwashed	favorable
PopMatters	6/10 stars

Amen Andrews vs. Spac Hand Luke is a studio album by Luke Vibert credited to two of his aliases, Amen Andrews and Spac Hand Luke. It was released in 2006 on Rephlex Records.

== Critical reception ==
John Bergstrom of PopMatters gave the album 6 stars out of 10, saying, "Whether by design or not, Vibert has made an album that largely mirrors the world it was made in: it's harrowing, violent, perverse—and yet you can't quite give up on it." Gary Suarez of Brainwashed gave the album a favorable review, saying, "Over 13 tracks, this charming yet spastic Jekyll and Hyde routine shifts almost tit-for-tat between furious ravetastic jungle and grimy curb-stomping dubstep, aggressively throwing wild punches and landing several direct hits to the jaw, crotch, and gut."

== Track listing ==
No.	Title	Length
1.	"London"	4:05
2.	"1 Shot Killer Pussy"	3:13
3.	"Like a Machine"	3:46
4.	"Screwface"	3:26
5.	"Grime II Dark"	4:02
6.	"Multiple Stab Wounds"	4:34
7.	"Grave"	3:41
8.	"Intelligent"	4:07
9.	"Barrave"	3:25
10.	"Amen Andrews"	4:57
11.	"Junglism"	3:40
12.	"Play"	4:03
13.	"Murder"	3:20
