= Here We Are (Yoomiii album) =

Studio album by Yoomiii
- Released: 16 June 2006
- Genre: Pop
- Label: Nu Kler! Records

Yoomiii chronology
Here We Are (2006)	Let the Music Play (2007)

Here We are is the debut studio album by German pop band Yoomiii. It was released on 16 June 2006 under Nu Kler! Records.

== History ==
The studio album was being written while broadcasting their documentary soap. Their recorded songs sometimes appeared on the show on special episodes.

== Singles ==
The first official single released off the album was the upbeat dance song "Gimme Gimme Gimme". It was released on 31 May 2006. An accompanying music video appeared on June 1.

The second and final single from the album was the dance ballad "A kiss is all I miss". It was released in October 2006 while the music video premiered on 12 September 2006.

== Track listing ==
1. Gimme Gimme Gimme 4:08
2. A Kiss is All I Miss 3:26
3. For Your Love 3:54
4. Party Girl 4:09
5. You Are My Sunshine 3:18
6. Schools Out for Summer 3:45
7. Run into the Sun 3:24
8. Here We Are 3:50
9. Take Me High 3:52
10. Teenage Love 3:37
11. Saturday Night 3:24
12. When the Rain Begins to Fall 4:23

== Chart performance ==
=== Weekly charts ===
Chart (2006)	Peak position
Austrian Albums (Ö3 Austria)	4
German Albums (Offizielle Top 100)	18
Swiss Albums (Schweizer Hitparade)	24

=== Year-end charts ===
Chart (2006)	Position
Austrian Albums (Ö3 Austria)	67
