= Big Soup =

Studio album by Luke Vibert
- Released: 7 July 1997
- Genre: Trip hop; instrumental hip hop
- Length: 76:15 (CD); 85:40 (LP)
- Label: Mo' Wax
- Producer: Luke Vibert

Luke Vibert chronology
Weirs (1993)	Big Soup (1997)	Stop the Panic (1999)

Big Soup is a studio album by English electronic musician Luke Vibert. His first non-collaborative studio album under his own name, it was released on 7 July 1997 by Mo' Wax.

== Musical style ==
Fact characterised Luke Vibert's production style on Big Soup as "sitting somewhere in between the sample-rich collages of DJ Shadow and the tight, precise constructions of DJ Krush and Major Force." Andy Kellman of AllMusic described Big Soup as an album of instrumental hip hop music.

== Release ==
Big Soup was released on 7 July 1997 by Mo' Wax. The sleeve artwork for the album was designed by Ben Drury.

In the United States, Big Soup was issued by Mo' Wax and FFRR Records. It garnered airplay on American college radio, entering the CMJ Top 200 chart.

== Critical reception ==
Professional ratings
Review scores
Source	Rating
AllMusic	4/5 stars
Muzik	8/10
NME	8/10
The Rolling Stone Album Guide	3/5 stars
Spin	5/10

In 2015, Fact ranked Big Soup at number five on its list of the best trip hop albums of all time.

== Track listing ==
All tracks are written by Luke Vibert.

CD edition
No.	Title	Length
1.	"Intro – Welcome"	1:34
2.	"Rank Rink Ring"	6:39
3.	"Voyage into the Unknown"	7:04
4.	"Fused into Music"	6:05
5.	"No Turn Unstoned"	8:27
6.	"Reality Check"	6:03
7.	"M.A.R.S."	6:42
8.	"Stern Facials"	7:47
9.	"Am I Still Dreaming?"	5:32
10.	"2001 Beats"	6:03
11.	"Music Called Jazz"	5:22
12.	"Space Race"	7:20
13.	"So Long – Outro"	1:37
Total length:		76:15

LP edition
No.	Title	Length
1.	"Intro – Welcome"	1:34
2.	"Rank Rink Ring"	6:39
3.	"Voyage into the Unknown"	7:04
4.	"Fused into Music"	6:05
5.	"No Turn Unstoned"	8:27
6.	"Reality Check"	6:03
7.	"M.A.R.S."	6:42
8.	"C.O.R.N."	1:52
9.	"Fresh"	1:25
10.	"Stern Facials"	7:47
11.	"Am I Still Dreaming?"	5:32
12.	"2001 Beats"	6:03
13.	"Original Soundmaster"	6:08
14.	"Music Called Jazz"	5:22
15.	"Space Race"	7:20
16.	"So Long – Outro"	1:37
Total length:		85:40

== Charts ==
Chart (1997)	Peak position
UK Albums (OCC)	119
