= Stop the Panic =

Studio album by Luke Vibert and BJ Cole
- Released: 25 January 2000
- Studio: The Batcave
- Genre: Electronica
- Length: 62:36
- Label: Astralwerks, Cooking Vinyl, Law & Auder Records
- Producer: Luke Vibert, BJ Cole

Luke Vibert chronology
Big Soup (1997)	Stop the Panic (2000)	YosepH (2003)

BJ Cole chronology
The Heart of the Moment (1995)	Stop the Panic (2000)	Trouble in Paradise (2004)

Professional ratings
Review scores
Source	Rating
AllMusic	4/5 stars
Pitchfork	6.7/10
The New Rolling Stone Album Guide	3.5/5 stars
Robert Christgau	(1-star Honorable Mention)

Stop the Panic is a collaborative album by Luke Vibert and BJ Cole, released in 2000.

== Critical reception ==
John Bush of AllMusic gave the album 4 stars out of 5 and said, "On most tracks, Cole's shimmering, fluid guitar lines are simply assimilated into Vibert's kitchen-sink production style". Paul Cooper of Pitchfork gave the album a 6.7 out of 10, commenting that "Though Cole runs through the primer on the Hawaiian glide and the Nashville glissando, Vibert's straight-ahead beats cut the cheese to a tolerable minimum."

In 2013, Spin named it one of the 20 best Astralwerks albums.

== Track listing ==
No.	Title	Length
1.	"Intro"	0:54
2.	"Swing Lite – Alright" (featuring Bobby Valentino on vocals)	3:29
3.	"Dischordzilla"	4:26
4.	"Start the Panic" (featuring Addie Brik and Iris Parker on vocals)	4:44
5.	"This Stuff Is Fresh"	6:03
6.	"Hipalong Hop" (featuring Mexeena Carlos on vocals)	4:23
7.	"Nice Cave" (featuring Addie Brik on vocals)	3:52
8.	"Cheng Phooey"	8:27
9.	"Fly Hawaii"	4:52
10.	"Watery Glass Planet (Pt.3)"	6:27
11.	"Party Animal"	4:00
12.	"Baby Steps" (featuring Holly Penfield on vocals)	6:55
13.	"Songs of the Night Life" (featuring Bobby Valentino on vocals)	3:56

Japanese edition bonus track
No.	Title	Length
14.	"Tom 'n' Us"	4:03

== Personnel ==
- Luke Vibert – programming
- BJ Cole – steel guitar, cheng, etc.
- Bobby Valentino – violin, mandolin, guitar
- Ben Davies – cello
- Guy Jackson – synthesizer, piano
- Tom Jenkinson – electric bass
- Andy Hamill – double bass
- Jeremy Simmonds – percussion
