= Weirs (album) =

Studio album by Vibert / Simmonds
- Released: September 1993
- Genre: Electronica, techno
- Length: 78:50
- Label: Rephlex Records
- Producer: Luke Vibert, Jeremy Simmonds

Luke Vibert chronology
Weirs (1993)	Big Soup (1997)

Professional ratings
Review scores
Source	Rating
AllMusic	3.5/5 stars

Weirs is the first collaborative studio album by Luke Vibert and Jeremy Simmonds released in 1993.

== Track listing ==
CD version
No.	Title	Length
1.	"Tinned Teardrop"	7:20
2.	"Path T'Zoar"	13:24
3.	"Reservoir"	19:19
4.	"(This Can) Robotic"	5:41
5.	"Indel Rooks"	11:19
6.	"Aple"	4:30
7.	"Thing Bounces Back"	12:21
8.	"Weirs"	2:00
9.	"Submarine"	2:56

Vinyl version
No.	Title	Length
1.	"Tinned Teardrop"
2.	"Mevdonique"
3.	"Path T'Zoar"
4.	"Reservoir"
5.	"(This Can) Robotic"
6.	"Indel Rooks"
7.	"Aple"
8.	"Thing Bounces Back"
9.	"Weirs"
10.	"Submarine"
11.	"Chamber No. 364"
