= Tally Ho! (album) =

Studio album by Wagon Christ
- Released: 28 September 1998
- Genre: Electronica, trip hop
- Length: 60:04
- Label: Virgin Records
- Producer: Wagon Christ

Wagon Christ chronology
Throbbing Pouch (1995)	Tally Ho! (1998)	Musipal (2001)

Professional ratings
Review scores
Source	Rating
AllMusic	4.5/5 stars
The New Rolling Stone Album Guide	3.5/5 stars
Pitchfork	7.9/10

Tally Ho! is a studio album by Luke Vibert, released in 1998. It is the third album under his alias Wagon Christ.

== Critical reception ==
Jason Kaufman of AllMusic gave the album 4.5 stars out of 5, commenting that "The songs here branch out in various directions, whether it's R&B beats giving way to classical piano flourishes or swelling basslines embracing gurgling samples, robotic blips, and kabuki drums." Ryan Schreiber of Pitchfork gave the album a 7.9 out of 10, saying, "It's got groove, love, and a sense of humor".

== Track listing ==
No.	Title	Length
1.	"Fly Swat"	5:11
2.	"Crazy Disco Party"	5:07
3.	"Tally Ho!"	4:33
4.	"Memory Towel"	5:36
5.	"Shimmering Haze"	6:17
6.	"Juicy Luke Vibert"	2:18
7.	"Piano Playa Hata"	4:57
8.	"Workout"	4:53
9.	"Rendleshack"	5:19
10.	"Lovely"	4:08
11.	"My Organ in Your Face"	5:11
12.	"Musical Box"	4:30
13.	"The End"	2:04
