= Chicago, Detroit, Redruth =

Studio album by Luke Vibert
- Released: 16 July 2007
- Genre: Acid techno, experimental techno
- Length: 63:07
- Label: Planet Mu
- Producer: Luke Vibert

Luke Vibert chronology
Lover's Acid (2005)	Chicago, Detroit, Redruth (2007)	Rhythm (2008)

Professional ratings
Review scores
Source	Rating
AllMusic	4/5 stars
The A.V. Club	B+
PopMatters	6/10 stars
Tiny Mix Tapes	3.5/5 stars

Chicago, Detroit, Redruth is the fourth studio album by Luke Vibert under his own name, released in 2007 on Planet Mu.

== Critical reception ==
Tim DiGravina of AllMusic gave the album 4 stars out of 5, commenting that "As the title suggests, things are a bit more old-school, at least on parts of this outing, with more tracks than usual forgoing Vibert's trademark wacky voice samples, though the anime and educational film voices are still at the heart of some of the songs." Nate Dorr of PopMatters gave the album 6 stars out of 10 and said, "Indeed, the album is good enough, but it could have been better than that with a little further care and development."

== Track listing ==
No.	Title	Length
1.	"Comfycozy"	5:34
2.	"Brain Rave"	4:31
3.	"Radio Savalas"	3:41
4.	"Breakbeat Metal Music"	4:39
5.	"God"	3:45
6.	"Clikilik"	5:18
7.	"Argument Fly"	7:53
8.	"Rotting Flesh Bags"	4:58
9.	"Comphex"	5:29
10.	"Rapperdacid"	3:41
11.	"Chicago, Detroit, Redruth"	5:33
12.	"Swet"	8:05

== Charts ==
Chart	Peak position
UK Dance Albums (OCC)	21
