= Frank Heiss =

American electronic record producer (1971–2018)

- Birth name: Frank Carter Heiss
- Also known as: HEISS, HearNow, tube, The Hick Step Massive, Lofi Junkiez, Hardware Junkiez
- Born: July 24, 1971; Boston, Massachusetts, United States
- Died: April 15, 2018 (aged 46)
- Genres: EDM, jungle, downtempo, hip hop, breaks, acid
- Occupation: Record producer
- Years active: 1996–2018
- Labels: Transcendent Tunes, EMI/Harvest Records, Rising High Records
- Website: HEISSmusik.com

Frank Heiss (July 24, 1971 – April 15, 2018) was an American electronic record producer best known by his alias HEISS. He previously toured and/or recorded under the aliases as tube, HearNow, Bionic Harmonic, and The Hick Step Massive.

Heiss released a large number of LPs, EPs, singles, and remixes, and in 2013 released the original album Ascensio(N), which Lost in Sound described as spiritual in tone, stating that "each track is stylistically unique. Heiss weaves through styles...from jazz fusion to drum n bass to reggae, and everything in between." The following year he released the remix album Awaken(D), featuring guest artists such as D.V.S*. Heiss was the owner of the record label Transcendent Tunes, which features music by future bass producers who seek a connection to the Divine.

== Early life, education ==
Heiss heard the hardcore dance music popular in the UK.

== Music career ==
=== Early years ===
In 1995, Heiss released the electronic EP Radical Technology under his full name on Rising High Records in the United Kingdom. This was followed in 1996 by the EP Flashdancers On Acid, a collaboration with Dr. Walker that was released on Sm:)e Communications in New York City. In the mid-1990s he also signed a recording contract with the New York City label Liquid Sky Music, under the moniker 'tube.' This was during the rise of American rave culture.

In 1998 while performing in and around Cologne, Germany another recording contract was established under the moniker HearNow, this time with Harvest/EMI - the label once home to Pink Floyd, Soft Machine and Deep Purple. In 1999, he toured as tube with the "To The Planet's Edge" tour in support of the Leeds UK goth band The Sisters Of Mercy.

The next phase in the career was a period of reflection and primarily studio only output. During this time that he wrote for and licensed music to a variety of television shows including One Life to Live, All My Children, and General Hospital. He also began his country/breakbeat mashup project known as The Hick Step Massive.

=== Releases as HEISS ===
Awake(N)

After the hiatus from music and the tour lifestyle, Heiss decided to stop using multiple monikers and simply go Heiss, or HEISS. He has stated, "I settled on 'HEISS' because it... encompasses everything I do under myself, with no leaning towards any specific genre or style." Making a return to live performance in 2012, HEISS released the full-length album Awake(N). In a review about the style, "Awake(N) is a 12-track compilation of electronic originals caked with a thick layer of hip-hop and instrumental influences. As you venture further into the album you start to become more familiar with his cohesive blend of glitch hop and breakbeat styles which are consistently paralleled with instrumental backdrops." Awake(N) was followed by a series of singles; "The Captive Mind" featuring Soham, "Jivanmukta," and "Svadu."

Ascensio(N)

His full-length album Ascensio(N) was released on November 12, 2013. According to The Untz, "there is an underlying tone of spiritual downtempo on all twelve tracks." A review by Lost in Sound stated, "In this most recent endeavor, he continues to narrate the spiritual journey he began to describe in 2012's Awake(N)." Also, "Positive and conscious lyrics are interspersed throughout the album," with Heiss writing and singing some of them himself. Others lyrics were contributed by guests artists, including emcees Jackson Whalan, Soham, singer Falu, and multi-instrumentalist Michael Garfield. About the style, "while there is an underlying musical and lyrical feeling holding the entire collection together, each track is stylistically unique. Heiss weaves through styles, hinting at a wide variety of genres, from jazz fusion to drum n bass to reggae, and everything in between."

Awaken(D) remix album

With the name HEISS he founded the Transcendent Tunes, which focuses on "sacred bass music." Heiss has stated, "I don't want the label to focus solely on bass music, or glitch, or any specific style, but music that emphasizes the betterment of the human soul and spirit." The first album on the label was Awaken(D), released on April 14, 2014.

Awaken(D) is an album of remixes by D.V.S* Skytree, Supersillyus, Soulacybin, Living Light, Push/Pull, Futexture, Erothyme and others. According to a review in Lost in Sound, "AThere's no place for genres in this album – it's an exploration of countless rhythms, BPM's, and frequencies. Awaken(D) truly is a magical collection of sacred bass music." From the album TrustTheBrain.com selected the Supersillyus remix of Heiss' track "Drop the Fuss" as one of its Top 7 Tracks Out This Week.

== Style, equipment ==
HEISS incorporated a wide variety of styles, not settling into a specific genre. However, he frequently used the stylings of genres including IDM, jungle, downtempo, hip hop, breaks, and acid. He used both analog and digital musical equipment.

== Personal life ==
Heiss died unexpectedly on April 15, 2018.

== Discography ==
=== Albums ===
LPs by HEISS, under various project names
Yr	Release title	Artist(s)	Label	Notes, role
1997	I'd Love To Turn You On	Bionic Harmonic (Frank Heiss, Deknow)	Whole Tone	double album
1997	Hanging By A Thread	Frank Heiss	Syncom Productionz	double album
1997	Alive	tube	Home Entertainment	January 1, 1997, CD/12" vinyl
1998	HearNow Bending Spoons	Frank Heiss	EMI/Harvest	CD, February 16, 1999
2000	Steak	tube	Whole Tone	January 1, 2000
2001	Mental Illness	tube	Whole Tone	
2002	USEN3 (compilation)	DJ Not (Frank Heiss)	Whole Tone	January 2001
2002	Me, Myself and Why (compilation)	Frank Heiss	Whole Tone	January 1, 2002
2004	Still Alive	tube	Whole Tone	
2008	Back to Basics	tube	Whole Tone	
2010	The Sixth Sense	tube	Whole Tone	
2012	Awake(N)	HEISS	Transcendent Tunes	December 12, 2012
2013	Ascensio(N)	HEISS	Transcendent Tunes	November 12, 2013
2014	Awaken(D) (remix album)	HEISS	Transcendent Tunes	April 14, 2014

=== EPs ===
EPs by HEISS, under various project names
Yr	Release title	Artist(s)	Label	Notes, role
1995	Radical Technology	Frank Heiss	Rising High Records (UK)	12" vinyl
1996	Flashdancers On Acid	Frank Heiss and Dr. Walker	Sm:)e Communications (NYC)	
1998	Ice Queen	Brotherz In Armz (Heiss, Ingmar Koch)	Syncom Productionz (gmbh)	
1998	Ordinary People	HearNow (Heiss)	Harvest Records	
1998	For The Young At Art	HearNow	Eat Raw (GER)	12" vinyl
1999	Untitled	The Dank (Heiss, Michael O'Connell)	Hotel Lotte	12" EP
2001	Leaving My Bed Today	The House Of Naught		
2004	The Hick Step Massive	The Hick Step Massive	The Hick Step Massive	November 9, 2004
2010	The Litmus Test EP	Frank Heiss	Acid All Stars	

=== Singles ===
Incomplete list of songs by Frank Heiss
Year	Title	Artist	Label	Notes
1996	"Nuttin' But An E Thang"	Phuturistic Phunk		
1997	"All Natural"	Tube		
1997	"Ziehen"	Tube		
1998	"Still Crazy After All These Beers"	LoFi Junkiez		
1998	"Let's Get Mental"	tube		
2013	"The Captive Mind" (feat. Soham)	HEISS		
2013	"Jivanmukta"	HEISS		
2013	"Svadu"	HEISS		
2013	"Practice Laughter Yoga" (feat. Soham)	HEISS	Mycelium Music	Included on Summer V/A Compilation 2013

=== Remixes ===
Frank Heiss remixes of material by other artists.

- 1997: "Abducted" by DJ Soul Slinger (tube Remix)
- 1999: "Flow Motion" by Can from the album Sacrilege (Air Liquide Remix) - production
- 2000: "Electro Organic Sound System" by Percussive Wave (Frank Heiss Remix)
- 2012: "Gunsligin Rambler" by Gangstagrass (The Hick Step Massive Remix)
- 2013: "Keep It Sacred, Keep It Safe" by Skytree (HEISS Remix)
- 2014: "Ecliptic Mystic" by Living Light (HEISS Remix)
- 2014: "The Silly Revolution" by Supersillyus (HEISS Remix)
