= Air Liquide (band) =

German electronic band

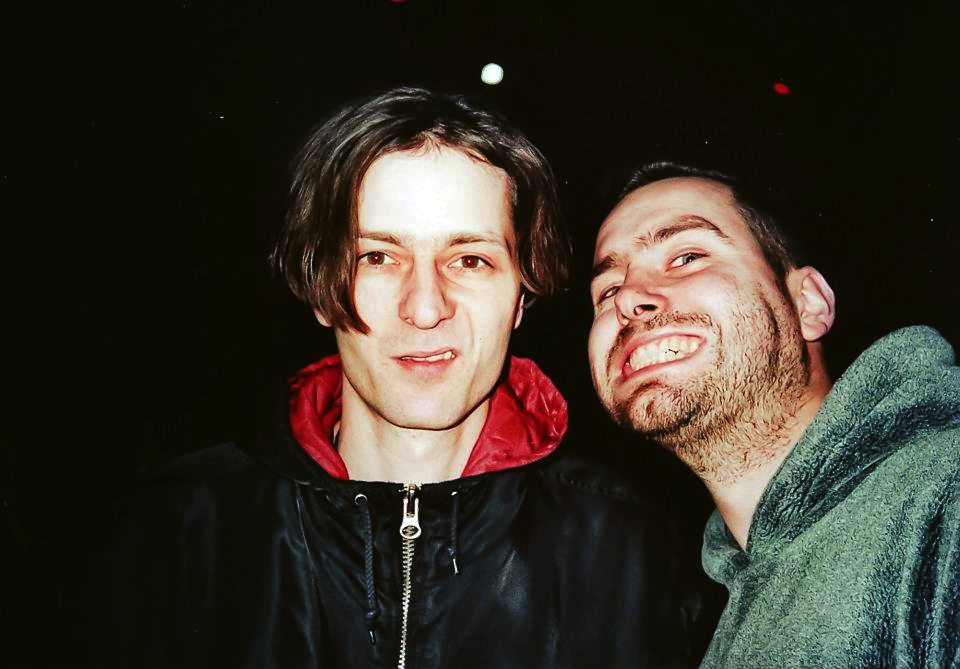
- Cem Oral (left) and Ingmar Koch

Background information
- Origin: Cologne, Germany
- Genres: Acid house Ambient techno Trance; Experimental
- Years active: 1991–present
- Labels: Structure; Rising High; Sm:)e Communications; Blue; Harvest
- Members: Ingmar Koch; Cem Oral
- Past members: Mary Applegate

Air Liquide is a German electronic band composed of Ingmar Koch (a.k.a. "Dr Walker") and Cem Oral (a.k.a. "Jammin' Unit") that was formed in Frankfurt in 1991. Koch and Oral continued to record together under the pseudonyms Madonna 303 and Jammin' Unit & Walker.

== History ==
Oral and Koch in 1991 met at a recording studio in Frankfurt. After a variety of jam sessions in Koch Studio, the duo released Neue Frankfurter Elektronik Schule. Lyrics and vocals for some songs was contributed by Koch's former girlfriend Mary Susan Applegate. Air Liquide was in the mid-1990s especially known for their live performances. The band broke up in 2005 after the previous year's album Let Your Ears Be the Receiver. The duo has continued to reunite and perform at various festivals since 2012.

== Discography ==
- Neue Frankfurter Elektronik Schule (1991)
- Liquid Air EP (1992)
- Air Liquide (1993)
- Mandragora (1993)
- Robot Wars (1994)
- Nephology (1994)
- If There Was No Gravity (1994)
- Space Brothers (1994)

A1 Space Brothers
A2 Synsonic
AA1 Twice Zero Is Zero
AA2 Imago II

published by Three-O-Three Music, Sony Music Publishing, licensed from BLUE Germany; copyrighted and produced by Rising High Productions Ltd.

- The Mercury EP
- The Increased Difficulty of Concentration (1994)
- Abuse Your Illusions (1995)
- Live in New York City 1994 (1995)
- Red (1995)
- Black (1995)
- Stroboplastics (1995)
- Sonic Weather Machine (1995)
- Homicidal Diary (1997)
- Uludag (1998)
- Reissued: Mandragora & Liquid Air (1998)
- Anybody Home? (1999)
- Lo Rider (1999)
- X (2001)
- Music is a Virus (2002)
- Let Your Ears Be the Receiver (2004)
- This Is a Mind Trip (2019)
