= Sidthug =

EP by Spac Hand Luke
- Released: 2006 June 06
- Label: Rephlex CAT 177 EP

Sidthug is the first EP by Luke Vibert under the alias Spac Hand Luke. The release was mastered by Matt Colton.

== Track listing ==
Side A

1. "Sidthug" - 4:10
2. "Psycho" - 3:51

Side B

1. "Synkik" - 6:10
2. "Dynocock" - 4:06
