= Kerrier District 2 =

EP by Kerrier District
- Released: 2006 July
- Genre: Disco, Acid house
- Label: Rephlex CAT 183
- Producer: Luke Vibert

Kerrier District chronology
Kerrier District (2004)	Kerrier District 2 (2006)

Professional ratings
Review scores
Source	Rating
Allmusic	3.5/5 stars

Kerrier District 2 is an album by Kerrier District, an alias of Luke Vibert.

== Track listing ==
=== CD version CAT 183 CD ===
1. "Ce Porte" - 5:12
2. "Disco Nasty" - 6:02
3. "Robotuss" - 5:34
4. "Sho U Rite" - 4:55
5. "Realistique" - 5:23
6. "Sho U Rite (Ceephax Remix)" - 7:34

=== 12" version CAT 183 T ===
Side "A"

1. "Sho U Rite" (122 Bpm)
2. "Disco Nasty" (115 Bpm)

Side "AA"

1. "Ce Porte" (110 Bpm)

=== 12" version CAT 183 R ===
Side "A"

1. "Robotuss" (116 Bpm)
2. "Realistique" (127 Bpm)

Side "AA"

1. "Sho U Rite (Ceephax Remix)"
