= Luke Vibert =

British musician (born 1973)

- Luke Vibert performing at Liquid Lounge in Cork City on 21 November 2008

Background information
- Also known as: Plug, Wagon Christ, Kerrier District, The Ace of Clubs, Amen Andrews, Spac Hand Luke, Butler Kiev, Luke Warm
- Born: Luke Francis Vibert; 26 January 1973 (age 53)
- Origin: Redruth, Cornwall, England
- Genres: Electronic, IDM, acid techno, drum and bass, trip hop
- Occupations: Musician, record producer
- Instruments: Keyboards, synthesizer
- Years active: 1990–present
- Labels: Rephlex, Ninja Tune, Astralwerks, Warp, Nothing Records, Mo' Wax, Planet Mu
- Website: www.lukevibert.com

Luke Vibert (born 26 January 1973) is a British electronic musician and producer, also known for his work under several aliases such as Plug and Wagon Christ. Raised in Cornwall, Vibert began releasing projects in the 1990s across varied genres, including techno, drum and bass, and trip hop. He has recorded on labels such as Rephlex, Ninja Tune, Planet Mu, and Warp.

== Early years: 1990s ==
Vibert's first musical output was in a variety of bands, including a punk act called Five Minute Fashion and later a Beastie Boys-esque group called the Hate Brothers, but he quickly moved into the low-cost environment of solo electronic composition.

Vibert grew up in Cornwall and attended the Wesleyan Methodist Truro School along with a number of key members of Aphex Twin's Rephlex Records crew. Luke and another school friend, Jeremy Simmonds, released an album on Rephlex under the name of Vibert/Simmonds which attracted attention from the Rising High music label. As a result of the popularity of the style in the early 1990s, Rising High commissioned an ambient music album from Vibert, who delivered Phat Lab Nightmare under the alias Wagon Christ in 1993.

Vibert pioneered the "drill 'n' bass" subgenre, which experimented with jungle and drum 'n' bass breakbeats, on his 1995 EPs under the name Plug. He would go on further over the next few years to produce more music under the Wagon Christ name for Rising High and Ninja Tune.

== 2000 and onwards ==
In late 1999 and 2000, Vibert began touring with BJ Cole to promote their fusion album Stop the Panic. In 2002, he would begin a series of live collaborations with Aphex Twin. Although Aphex Twin and Luke Vibert never released an album together, Aphex Twin used the song name "Analord", from Vibert's album Lover's Acid, for a series of EPs. Vibert's later releases varied in style as he released albums under various names, including Plug, Amen Andrews, Kerrier District and Spac Hand Luke. "Amen Andrews" is a word play on the name of Irish game show host Eamonn Andrews, referring to the fact that each Amen Andrews track uses the Amen break. In 2004, Vibert explored acid disco when he remixed a Black Devil song, which was released on Disco Club (Remix) and released his first album under the alias Kerrier District.

In 2006, Vibert's song "Shadows" was featured on the DJ mix album A Bugged Out Mix by Miss Kittin, which charted at number one-hundred seventy on the French Albums Chart.

In 2007 he founded a club night with Posthuman called "I Love Acid" after his track. In 2019 it won Best British Club Event in the DJ Mag awards. A vinyl-only record label of the same name was founded in 2014, with Luke contributing two EPs and an album "Valvable" written entirely on three pieces of Roland equipment: TB303, TR808, and JX3P.

In 2015, he participated in the musical transmedia Soundhunters broadcast on the Franco-German channel Arte. For this project, Vibert appeared in the film Speak the way you breathe directed by the American film director Antonino D'Ambrosio and composed an original music of the same name.

== Discography ==
=== Albums ===
Title	Alias	Release	Label
Weirs	Vibert/Simmonds	1993	Rephlex
Phat Lab Nightmare	Wagon Christ	1994	Rising High
Throbbing Pouch	Wagon Christ	1995	Rising High
Drum 'n' Bass for Papa	Plug	1996	Blue Planet
Big Soup	Luke Vibert	1997	Mo' Wax
Tally Ho!	Wagon Christ	1998	Astralwerks
Stop the Panic	Luke Vibert & B. J. Cole	2000	Astralwerks
Musipal	Wagon Christ	2001	Ninja Tune
YosepH	Luke Vibert	2003	Warp
Kerrier District	Kerrier District	2004	Rephlex
Sorry I Make You Lush	Wagon Christ	2004	Ninja Tune
Lover's Acid	Luke Vibert	2005	Planet Mu
Amen Andrews Vs. Spac Hand Luke	Amen Andrews, Spac Hand Luke	2006	Rephlex
Benefist	The Ace of Clubs	2007	First Cask
Chicago, Detroit, Redruth	Luke Vibert	2007	Planet Mu
Moog Acid	Jean Jacques Perrey and Luke Vibert	2007	Lo Recordings
Rodulate	Vibert/Simmonds	2008	Rephlex
Rhythm	ルーク・ヴァイバート	2008	Sound of Speed
We Hear You	Luke Vibert	2009	Planet Mu
Toomorrow	Wagon Christ	2011	Ninja Tune
Back on Time	Plug	2011	BEAT Records
Ridmik	Luke Vibert	2014	Hypercolour
4	Kerrier District	2015	Hypercolour
Bizarster	Luke Vibert	2015	Planet Mu
Luke Vibert Presents UK Garave Vol. 1	Luke Vibert	2017	Hypercolour Records
Smell The Urgency	Bluke (Luke Vibert and BluRum13)	2017	Besides Records
Sense The Urgency	Bluke (Luke Vibert and BluRum13)	2019	Ropeadope
Valvable	Luke Vibert	2019	I Love Acid
Luke Vibert Presents Amen Andrews	Luke Vibert	2020	Hypercolour Records
Luke Vibert Presents Modern Rave	Luke Vibert	2020	Hypercolour Records
Luke Vibert Presents Rave Hop	Luke Vibert	2020	Hypercolour Records
Recepticon	Wagon Christ	2020	People of Rhythm
GRIT	Luke Vibert	2022	Hypercolour Records
Machine Funk	Luke Vibert	2023	De:tuned
Planet Roll	Wagon Christ	2025	De:tuned
Variety Magic	Plug	2026	De:tuned

=== EPs ===
Title	Alias	Release	Label
Sunset Boulevard EP	Wagon Christ	1994	Rising High
At Atmos EP	Wagon Christ	1994	Rising High
Rissalecki EP	Wagon Christ	1995-03	Rising High
Redone EP	Wagon Christ	1995-09	Rising High
A Polished Solid	Luke Vibert	1995	Mo' Wax
Me & Mr. Sutton	Plug	1997-07	Blue Planet
The Power of Love	Wagon Christ	1998-06-02	Astralwerks
Lovely	Wagon Christ	1998-08-25	Astralwerks
'95-'99	Luke Vibert	2000-06	Planet Mu
Homewerk	Luke Vibert	2002-05-10	Planet Mu
Shadows	Wagon Christ	2004	Ninja Tune
Sidthug	Spac Hand Luke	2006-06-06	Rephlex
Moog Acid	Jean Jacques Perrey and Luke Vibert	2006-06-26	LoEB
Kerrier District 2	Kerrier District	2006-07-11	Rephlex
Here It Comes EP	Plug	2006-11-30	Rewind
Rubber Chunks EP	The Ace of Clubs	2007-06-04	First Cask
Mate Tron	Luke Vibert	2007-07-02	Planet Mu
Instant Vibe	Luke Warm	2014-04-21	Blueberry Recordings
News of the World	Amen Andrews	2014-11-10	Blueberry Recordings
Turn EP	Luke Vibert	2018-01-19	People of Rhythm
Arcadia	Luke Vibert	2014-04-12	De:tuned

=== Compilation albums ===
Title	Alias	Release	Label
Drum 'N' Bass for Papa/Plug EP's 1, 2 & 3	Plug	1997-09-09	Nothing/Interscope
Nuggets: Luke Vibert's Selection	Luke Vibert	2001-08-07	Lo Recordings
Further Nuggets	Luke Vibert	2002-05-20	Lo Recordings
Luke Viberts Nuggets 3	Luke Vibert	2013-10-14	Lo Recordings

=== Singles ===
Title	Alias	Release	Label
"Plug 1 Visible Crater Funk"	Plug	1995	Rising High
"Plug 2 Rebuilt Kev"	Plug	1995	Rising High
"Plug 3 Versatile Crib Funk"	Plug	1995	Rising High
"Do Unto Others"	Luke Vibert	1997	Mo' Wax
"Drum 'n' Bass 'n' Steel"	Luke Vibert & B.J. Cole	1999-11-01	Law & Auder
"Spring Collection"	Luke Vibert & B.J. Cole	2000-10-31	Cooking Vinyl
"Receiver"	Wagon Christ	2001-02-20	Ninja Tune
"Ataride"	Wagon Christ	2001-06-12	Ninja Tune
"Classid Trax"	The Ace of Clubs	2002	Paperplane
"Vol 01"	Amen Andrews	2003-08-12	Rephlex
"Vol 02"	Amen Andrews	2003-09-09	Rephlex
"Vol 03"	Amen Andrews	2003-09-23	Rephlex
"Vol 04"	Amen Andrews	2003-08-12	Rephlex
"Vol 05"	Amen Andrews	2003-11-04	Rephlex
"Shadows"	Wagon Christ	2004-08-24	Ninja Tune
"Lover's Acid"	Luke Vibert	2005-03-14	Planet Mu

=== Compilation appearances ===
Song title	Alias	Released on	Date released
"Get Your Head Down"	Luke Vibert	Ninja Cuts: Flexistentialism	1996
"Argos"	Plug	Mealtime (Planet μ Records Compilation)	1997
"Rewind Selecta"	Butler Kiev	μ Allstars - Criminal/Hang All DJ's Volume 3	2000/2003

=== Remixes ===
Song title	Alias	Released on	Date released
"Vacuum Sucker"	Wagon Christ	Aural Expansion - Remixed Sheep	1995
"Turtle Soup (Wagon Christ Mix)"	Wagon Christ	DJ Food- Refried Food	1996
"The Lake of Winter (Wagon Christ Mix)"	Wagon Christ	Nobukazu Takemura - Child's View Remix	1996
"The Perfect Drug (Remixed by Plug)"	Plug	Nine Inch Nails - "The Perfect Drug" Versions	1997
"Radio Babylon (Luke Vibert Mix)"	Luke Vibert	Meat Beat Manifesto - Original Fire	1997
"Genius (Luke Vibert Mix)"	Luke Vibert	Pitchshifter - Genius Single	1998
"Tank (Luke Vibert Remix)"	Luke Vibert	Cowboy Bebop Remixes: Music for Freelance	1999
"Shin Triad (Wagon Christ Mix)"	Wagon Christ	Squarepusher - Maximum Priest E.P.	1999
"Timing, Forget The Timing (Kerrier District Remix)"	Kerrier District	Disco Club (Remix)	2004
