= Yoomiii =

German music band

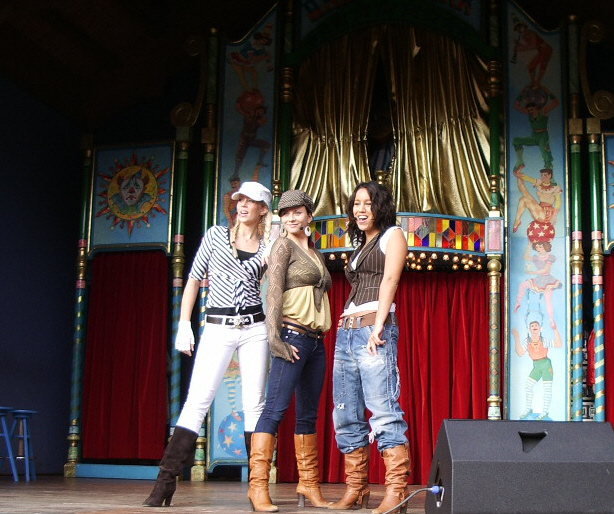

Background information
- Origin: Germany/Netherlands
- Genres: Pop, dance-pop
- Years active: 2006–2008

Yoomiii was a three-member girl group, with two members from Germany and one from the Netherlands.

== History ==
After success with the documentary soap Das Star-Tagebuch with the German band Banaroo, Super RTL decided to start a second show in year 2006. Yoomiii was composed to the beginning of the year 2006 for the documentary soap Yoomiii: Das Star-Tagebuch, who sent everyday between April and July on Super RTL.

== Members ==
- Bouchra Nisha Tjon Pon Fong (born 28 April 1983 in Utrecht)
- Kristin Siegel (born 7 October 1986 in Leipzig)
- Nina Alexandra Filipp (born 10 May 1984 in Hamburg)

== Discography ==
=== Albums ===
year	title	peak		
year	title	GER	AT	SWI
2006	Here We Are	18	4	24
2007	Let the Music Play	-	-	-

=== Singles ===
year	title	peak			albums
year	title	GER	AT	SWI	albums
2006	Gimme, Gimme, Gimme	12	4	12	Here We Are
2006	A Kiss Is All I Miss	41	22	31	Here We Are
2007	Rhythm of Love	93	-	-	Let the Music Play

=== DVD ===
- 2006 Yoomiii der Film
