= Shadows (Wagon Christ EP) =

EP by Wagon Christ
- Released: 2004
- Label: Ninja Tune

Shadows is an album by Luke Vibert under the alias Wagon Christ. "Shadows" contains a sample from the James Bond film Diamonds Are Forever, titled "007 and Counting" on the original soundtrack recording.

== Track listing ==
- CD version
1. "Shadows" - 3:45
2. "The Groove (Souled Out)" - 1:55
3. "Loose Loggins" - 3:24
4. "Deux Ans De Maïa" - 2:46
- Includes a QuickTime music video of "Shadows".
- 12" vinyl version
1. "Shadows"
2. "The Groove (Souled Out)"
3. "Loose Loggins"
4. "Deux Ans De Maïa"

== Song usage ==
Miss Kittin used "Shadows" on her mix album A Bugged Out Mix.
