= Kerrier District (album) =

Studio album by Kerrier District
- Released: 26 January 2004
- Genre: Disco, acid house
- Length: 62:08
- Label: Rephlex Records
- Producer: Luke Vibert

Kerrier District chronology
| Kerrier District (2004) | Kerrier District 2 (2006) |

Professional ratings
Review scores
| Source | Rating |
|---|---|
| AllMusic | 3.5/5 stars |
| Dusted Magazine | favorable |
| Tiny Mix Tapes | 3.5/5 stars |

Kerrier District is a 2004 studio album by Luke Vibert, released under the alias Kerrier District. Originally released in 2004 on Rephlex Records, it was re-released in 2016 on Hypercolour.

== Critical reception ==
Andy Kellman of AllMusic gave the album 3.5 stars out of 5, saying, "Vibert leaves the impression that the foundation of each track was pulled off by a small cast of keyboardists, drum programmers, hand-percussionists, and horn players." Jean-Pierre of Tiny Mix Tapes gave the album 3.5 stars out of 5, stating that "the album mixes elements of reggae and dub on ‘Silhouettes,' Daft Punk-esque analog synths on 'Let's Dance and Freak,' and early '80s New York disco on 'Illogan.'"

== Track listing ==
| No. | Title | Length |
|---|---|---|
| 1. | "Let's Dance and Freak" | 5:08 |
| 2. | "Silhouettes" | 6:42 |
| 3. | "Illogan" | 7:14 |
| 4. | "Disclix" | 5:27 |
| 5. | "Disco Bus" | 6:49 |
| 6. | "New York" | 7:10 |
| 7. | "Yesco" | 6:30 |
| 8. | "Negresco" | 5:38 |
| 9. | "Wide Vice" | 6:41 |
| 10. | "Squaredance" | 4:49 |
