= Me & Mr. Sutton =

EP by Plug
- Released: 1997 July
- Label: Blue Planet Recordings PLAN 8
- Producer: Luke Vibert

Me & Mr. Sutton is a release by Luke Vibert under the alias Plug.

== Track listing ==
=== CD ===
1. "Cut (Plug Remix)" - 8:05
2. "Me And Mr. Jones (Boymerang Remix)" - 5:29
  - Remix: Boymerang
3. "Cut (Original Mix)" - 7:19

=== 12" vinyl ===
Side A

1. "Cut (Plug '97 Remix)" - 8:00

Side AA

1. "Me & Mr. Jones (Boymerang Remix)" - 5:27
  - Remix: Boymerang
