= B. J. Cole =

British musician (born 1946)

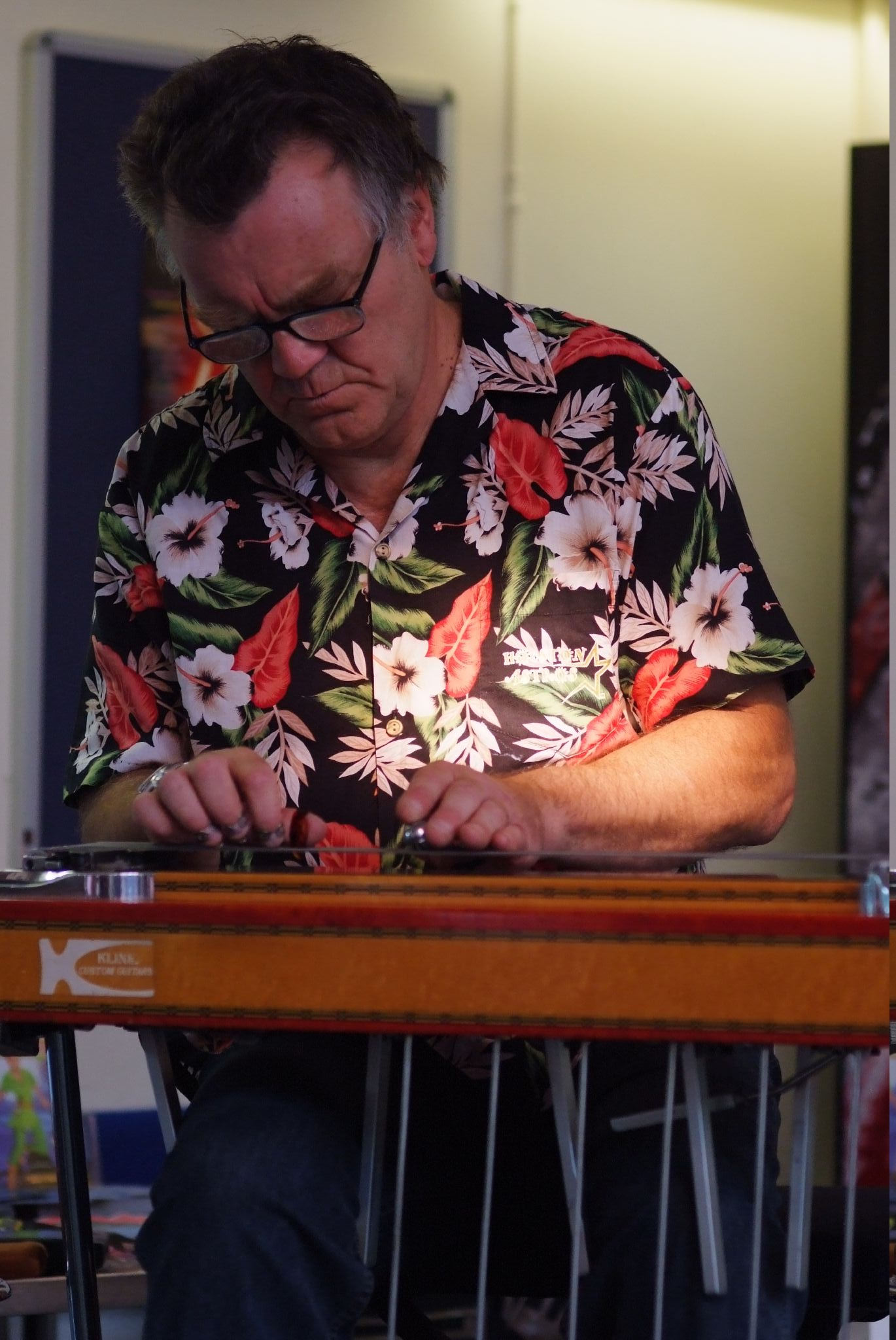
- Cole in 2007

Background information
- Born: Brian John Cole; 17 June 1946 (age 80); London, England
- Genres: Country; pop; rock; classical
- Occupation: Musician
- Instruments: Pedal steel guitar; lap steel guitar; dobro
- Years active: 1968–present
- Labels: United Artists; Hannibal, Resurgence; Cooking Vinyl; Cantaloupe
- Formerly of: Cochise
- Website: bjcole.co.uk

Brian John Cole (born 17 June 1946) is an English pedal steel guitarist, who has long been active as a session and solo musician. Coming to prominence in the early 1970s with the band Cochise, Cole has played in many styles, ranging from mainstream pop and rock to jazz and eclectic experimental music, but has never forgotten the instrument's roots in country music. Cole plays lap steel and dobro.

== Early life and musical beginnings ==
Brian John Cole was born on 17 June 1946 in London. He grew up in Enfield, attending Chase Side primary school and Enfield Chase secondary school for boys. He became interested in music in his teens, his first major inspiration being The Shadows. Cole initially learned to play guitar, but became disillusioned with the instrument, conscious of the number of talented guitarists that were already active on the music scene. Performances by the American duo Santo & Johnny aired on the Perry Como show introduced him to the exotic and unusual sound of the steel guitar, and in 1963, he traded in some toy trains to buy his first lap steel – a Dallas Rangemaster.

Around two years later, Cole first became aware of the pedal steel guitar, and soon acquired his first instrument, a Fender 1000. What had been an enthusiasm now became a passion: Cole began to play in bands in his free time and to become actively involved in the music scene, landing his first ‘proper’ session in 1968; this was for Albert Lee, work which was included on the album Black Claw & Country Fever, released much later, in 1991.

== Rise to prominence ==
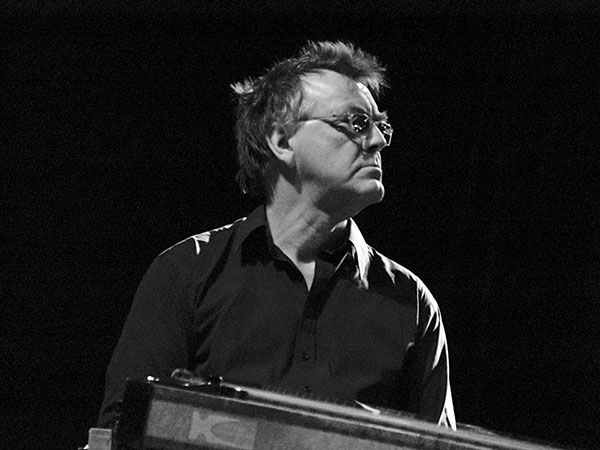
B. J. Cole (2013) in Aarhus, Denmark

In 1968, while playing at a gig in Kingston, south London, Cole was head-hunted to join what was to be an English group conceived on the lines of the Flying Burrito Brothers. The project never got off the ground, but through it Cole was introduced to the singer Stewart Brown, a former member of the band Bluesology with Elton John. In 1969, Brown invited Cole to become a member of the new heavy rock/country band Cochise, with Mick Grabham on guitar, Rick Wills on bass, and Willie Wilson on drums. Cochise enjoyed moderate success, and released three albums – Cochise (Liberty/United Artists, 1970), Swallow Tales (United Artists, 1971) and So Far (United Artists, 1972) – all of which included songs written by Cole. The tracks on these albums were included on a two-disc anthology, Velvet Mountain (Eclectic/Cherry Red), issued in 2013.

Cochise folded in 1972, but through it Cole came into contact with a wide range of active and high-profile musicians, including Andy Fairweather Low and Steve Marriott. He went on to carry out recording sessions with all of them, but his breakthrough moment came in 1971, when he played steel guitar on Elton John's "Tiny Dancer", included on the album Madman Across the Water.

== 1970s ==
Throughout the 1970s, Cole was greatly in demand as a session musician, appearing with artists including: Humble Pie (Cole played on three of their albums, including Eat It from 1973), Roger Daltrey (Daltrey, 1973), Man (Christmas at the Patti, 1973), Kiki Dee (Loving & Free, 1973, and I’ve Got the Music In Me, 1974), Procol Harum (Exotic Birds and Fruit, 1974), T. Rex (Zinc Alloy and the Hidden Riders of Tomorrow, 1974), the Walker Brothers (No Regrets, 1975), Uriah Heep (Magician's Birthday, 1972, Return to Fantasy, 1975), Andy Fairweather Low (La Booga Rooga, 1975, including "Wide Eyed and Legless"), Joan Armatrading ("Down to Zero", 1976), Roy Harper ("One of Those Days in England", 1977), Gerry Rafferty (City to City, 1978), and Cat Stevens (Back to Earth, 1978).

== Cow Pie Records and the Hank Wangford Band ==
In 1976, Cole went to America for the first time, and returned to England full of excitement and enthusiasm about the music he had heard. His contacts at United Artists – who had signed Cochise – suggested he start a record label to encourage British country artists, and the result was Cow Pie, founded in 1977. Records issued by the label included Nancy Peppers’ Leaving for Better Times (1978).

Cole's search for new British country performers brought him into contact with the singer-songwriter Hank Wangford (the stage name of Dr Sam Hutt), and in 1980 Cow Pie Records issued Wangford's first album, Cowboys Stay on Longer, featuring Cole on pedal steel as well as various friends and fellow musicians including guitarist Andy Roberts and singer Melanie Harrold. Around the same time, Cole (given the stage name ‘Manley Footwear’) was a founder member of the Hank Wangford Band, which Roberts and Harrold joined. The band proved very popular, performing regularly at gigs and festivals. Cole remained a member until 1983, around a year after the demise of Cow Pie. He rejoined Hank's current band in 2008.

== Session and live work, 1982 to the present ==
In the years around 1980, demand for the steel guitar in recorded music experienced a slump, reflecting the popularity of punk and the introduction of the synthesiser. However, Cole continued to attract session work, which he returned to in earnest after the demise of Cow Pie. Credits from the 1980s include performances with: Shakin' Stevens ("Give Me Your Heart Tonight" and "Hot Dog", 1982), Paul Young ("Everything Must Change", 1985), David Sylvian (Gone to Earth, 1986), The Stranglers (Dreamtime, 1986), Deacon Blue ("Chocolate Girl", 1987), Dumptruck (For the Country, 1987), and k.d. lang (Angel with a Lariat, 1987).

In the 1990s, Cole toured over a period of five to six years with John Cale, formerly of the Velvet Underground, work which helped to raise his profile internationally. At the end of the decade, he made some select appearances playing live with R.E.M., and joined The Verve for their tour of America, subsequently appearing on Richard Ashcroft's solo album Alone with Everybody (2000). Other session work of this period included contributions to: Peter Blegvad (King Strut and Other Stories, 1990), Gerry Rafferty (On a Wing and a Prayer, 1992), Billie Ray Martin (Four Ambient Tales, 1993), The Orb (Orbus Terrarum, 1995), Echobelly (On, 1995), Björk (Post, 1995), Depeche Mode (Ultra, 1997), Spiritualized (Ladies and Gentlemen We Are Floating in Space, 1997), and the Pet Shop Boys (Nightlife, 1999). Through his solo work, Cole came to the attention of Sting, and he appeared on the albums Mercury Falling (1996), Brand New Day (1999) and All This Time (2001), also performing live in Sting's band.

In more recent years, Cole has remained in demand, his credits including: Eliza Carthy (Angels & Cigarettes, 2000), Chumbawamba (WYSIWYG, 2000), Robbie Williams ("Eternity", 2001), Graham Coxon (The Kiss of Morning, 2002), Robert Plant (Dreamland, 2002, and Sixty Six to Timbuktu, 2003), Groove Armada (Lovebox, 2003), David Gilmour (On an Island, 2006), Martin Simpson (True Stories, 2009, and Purpose + Grace, 2011), Katie Melua (The House, 2010), and Tom Jones (Praise & Blame, 2010). In 2012, he was a featured soloist with Icebreaker in a live version of Brian Eno's album Apollo: Atmospheres and Soundtracks. He has also played live with First Aid Kit, Ethan Johns, Michael Messer, the folk singer Bonnie Dobson, and Terry Reid, and has returned to perform with Hank Wangford, appearing at gigs and on albums such as Whistling in the Dark (2008).

== Solo work ==
Cole's solo music has always been experimental, and has involved work as a performer as well as a writer, arranger, mixer and producer. His first solo album was The New Hovering Dog (1972), issued shortly after the breakup of Cochise. The album was remastered and re-released in 2013.

In the 1980s – alongside his session and live performances, and also work as a music journalist – Cole became increasingly interested in ambient and classical music, and the way in which this could be adapted for the pedal steel guitar. A project undertaken with Guy Jackson resulted in Transparent Music (Hannibal/Rykodisc, 1989), including pieces by Erik Satie and others. This was followed by Heart of the Moment (Resurgence, 1995), Lushlife, with Roger Beaujolais and Simon Thorpe (United Artists, 2009), and Transparent Music 2, featuring Guy Jackson, Arve Henriksen and Davy Spillane (United Artists, 2012).

In the late 1990s, a desire to work with a DJ drew Cole to Luke Vibert, the result of their collaboration being Stop the Panic (Cooking Vinyl/Astralwerks, 2000), an electronica album inspired by their shared passion for exotica and drum ‘n’ bass. A similar theme runs through Cole's Trouble in Paradise (Cooking Vinyl, 2004).

== Instruments ==
Cole initially learned on a six-string Dallas Rangemaster lap steel, before buying his first pedal steel – a double eight-string Fender 1000 – in about 1966. He continued to use this until 1971, when he switched to a black single-neck ten-string Emmons pedal steel; this was the instrument that he played on the final Cochise album and on sessions including ‘Tiny Dancer’. In 1975, Cole bought a twelve-string Emmons pedal steel, and then in 1982, while in America, he acquired a new twelve-string instrument made by Joe Kline. This has remained his principal pedal steel until very recently. Cole is now using a twelve-string pedal steel made for him by Bill Rudolph of the Williams Guitar Co. He also plays a dobro custom-made for him by his father, John Cole.

== Selected discography ==
=== Solo and collaborative ===
- The New Hovering Dog (1972)
- Transparent Music (1989)
- Heart of the Moment (1995)
- Stop the Panic (2000; with Luke Vibert)
- Trouble in Paradise (2004)
- Transparent Music 2 (2012)
- Apollo (2012; with Icebreaker)

=== With Cochise ===
- Cochise (1970)
- Swallow Tales (1971)
- So Far (1972)

=== Featured artist ===
- Humble Pie, Humble Pie (1970)
- Humble Pie, Rock On (1971)
- Dave Edmunds, Rockpile (1972)
- Trapeze, You Are the Music...We're Just the Band (1972)
- Keith Cross & Peter Ross, Bored Civilians (1972)
- Uriah Heep, The Magician's Birthday (1972; "Tales")
- Elton John, Madman Across the Water (1972; "Tiny Dancer")
- The Goodies, The World of the Goodies (1973)
- Pete Sinfield, "Still" (1973)
- Jerry Lee Lewis, The Session (1973)
- Mike de Albuquerque, We May Be Cattle But We've All Got Names (1973)
- Johnny Hallyday, Insolitudes (1973)
- Kiki Dee, Loving & Free (1973)
- Teresa Brewer (with Oily Rags), In London (1973)
- Humble Pie, Eat It (1973)
- Roger Daltrey, Daltrey (1973)
- T. Rex, Zinc Alloy and the Hidden Riders of Tomorrow (1974)
- Kiki Dee, I’ve Got the Music in Me (1974)
- Procol Harum, Exotic Birds and Fruit (1974)
- Uriah Heep, Return to Fantasy (1975)
- The Walker Brothers, No Regrets (1975)
- Andy Fairweather Low, La Booga Rooga (1975)
- Joan Armatrading, Joan Armatrading (1976; "Down to Zero")
- Olivia Newton-John, Come on Over (1976)
- Kevin Ayers “Yes We Have No Mañanas (So Get Your Mañanas Today)" (1976)
- Alan Parsons, I Robot (1977)
- Cat Stevens, Back to Earth (1978)
- Gerry Rafferty, City to City (1978)
- Elton John, A Single Man (1978)
- Roy Harper, The Unknown Soldier (1980)
- The Moody Blues, Long Distance Voyager (1981)
- Shakin' Stevens, Shaky (1981)
- Shakin’ Stevens, Give Me Your Heart Tonight (1982)
- Paul Young, The Secret of Association (1985)
- David Sylvian, Gone to Earth (1986)
- The Stranglers, Dreamtime (1986)
- Deacon Blue, Raintown (1987; "Chocolate Girl")
- K. D. Lang, Angel with a Lariat (1987)
- Felt, Me and a Monkey on the Moon (1989)
- Peter Blegvad, King Strut and other Stories (1990)
- Harold Budd: By the Dawn's Early Light (1991)
- Albert Lee, Black Claw/Country Fever (1991)
- Gerry Rafferty, On a Wing and a Prayer (1992)
- Roger Waters, Amused to Death (1992)
- The Orb, Orbus Terrarum (1995)
- Echobelly, On (1995)
- Jimmy Nail, Crocodile Shoes (1995)
- The Selecter, Pucker! (1995)
- John Cale, Walking on Locusts (1996)
- Sting, Mercury Falling (1996)
- Depeche Mode, Ultra (1997)
- Spiritualized, Ladies and Gentlemen We Are Floating in Space (1997)
- Pet Shop Boys, Nightlife (1999)
- Sting, Brand New Day (1999)
- Richard Ashcroft, Alone with Everybody (2000)
- Eliza Carthy, Angels & Cigarettes (2000)
- Sting, All This Time (2001)
- Graham Coxon, The Kiss of Morning (2002)
- Robert Plant, Dreamland (2002)
- Björk, Post Live (2003)
- Robert Plant, Sixty Six to Timbuktu (2003)
- Groove Armada, Lovebox (2003)
- David Gilmour, On an Island (2006)
- Deep Wilson, In 1609 We Came Back To Earth (2009)
- Martin Simpson, True Stories (2009)
- Devon Sproule, Don't Hurry For Heaven (2009)
- Katie Melua, The House (2010)
- The Kropotkins, Paradise Square (2010)
- Tom Jones, Praise & Blame (2010)
- Martin Simpson, Purpose & Grace (2011)
- Luke Tuchscherer, Always Be True (2017)
- R.E.M., R.E.M. at the BBC (2018)
- Madeon, Good Faith (2019)
- Matt Berry, Phantom Birds (2020)
- Liam Gallagher, C'mon You Know (2022)
- black midi, Hellfire (2022)
- Vladimír Mišík: Vteřiny, měsíce a roky (2024)

== See also ==
- List of ambient music artists
