= Cem Oral =

German musician

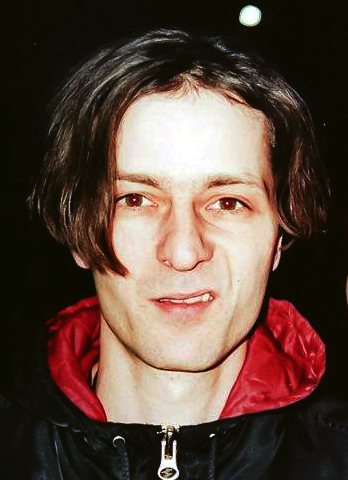

Background information
- Genres: Ambient techno, acid house
- Occupation: Musician
- Years active: 1991–present
- Labels: Sm:)e
- Formerly of: Air Liquide, Ultrahigh

Cem Oral, also known under his pseudonyms Jammin' Unit and G 104, is a German musician, label owner and mastering engineer. He was a member of the techno projects Air Liquide (1991 to 2005), Ultrahigh (1993 to 2003) and UMO (1996–2000).

== Biography ==
Oral was born in Germany as the son of a Turkish father and a Finnish mother. His brother Can Oral (also known as Khan) has also worked as a musician. He began experimenting with a 4-track recorder and synthesizers when he was a teenager.

In 1991 he founded the band Air Liquide with Ingmar Koch, which lasted until 2005. With Koch and Jörg Burger, he founded the music label Blue in 1992, in which, among other publications of its own projects such as Air Liquide, M.F.A., H.E.A.D., G.E.F. and Electronic Dub appeared. Together with Roger Cobernus, he founded the project Ultrahigh in 1993. In 1995 he founded, with his Ultrahigh bandmate Roger Cobernus, the label Pharma which is based out in Frankfurt, on the next production of the two operators also works the artist DMX Krew and Bad Street Boy appeared. With Adel Hafsi and Cem Oral founded the project UMO (Unidentified Musical Objects), which released three albums between 1996 and 2000.

Since 1993 he has run the studio Jammin Masters. He worked with the musicians Wu-Tang Clan, Michael Rother, George McCrae, Black Eyed Peas, Gwen Stefani, Nine Inch Nails, Mad Professor, Coldcut, stereo Total, Mark Stewart, Daddy Freddy, Prong, Holger Czukay, FM unit, The Shamen, BVSMP, Captain Comatose, Oscar Sala, Kerosene, skin, Vapourspace, Caspar Pound and Jay Haze. Cem Oral currently lives and works in Berlin.

== Discography ==
=== Studio albums ===
- 1995: Jammin' Unit – Jammin' Unit Discovers Chemical Dub (Rising High Records)
- 1997: Jammin' Unit – Deaf, Dub And Blind (Blue Planet Recordings)
- 1998: Witchman vs. Jammin' Unit – Inferno (Blue Planet Recordings)
- 1998: Jammin' Unit – Are You Prepared? (Pharma)

=== Singles and EPs ===
- 1993: G 104 – Mind Missile EP (Force Inc. Music Works)
- 1993: Jammin' Unit – Kardeslik EP (Structure)
- 1994: Free Radicals – Carrera E.P. (OZON)
- 1994: Jammin' Unit vs. Walker – Money Talk$! (Dj.ungle Fever)
- 1994: Jammin' Unit – Flower Swing (Dj.ungle Fever)
- 1994: Jammin' Unit – 140 (Force Inc. Music Works)
- 1994: Biochip C., Jammin' Unit & Walker – Shark-Trax (Rising High Records)
- 1995: G 104 / Kerosene – Foolda Gap / Camp King (Pharma)
- 1995: G 104 / Kerosene – Nurse City / Bassphemic Village (Pharma)
- 1995: Jammin' Unit – Remote Car Babe (Temple Records N.Y.C. Inc.)
- 1996: G 104 – On The Floor (Pharma)
- 1996: Jammin' Unit – Totally Unintelligent (Rising High Records)
- 1997: Kerosene / Jammin' Unit – Heroin (Pharma)
- 1997: Oral Experience – Never Been on E (Eat Raw)
- 1998: G 104 – Cut That Shit (Pharma)
- 2002: Dr. Echo featuring Nkosazana – Blue Sky (Third World Records)
- 2003: Jammin' Unit – Heroin.Remix (Devoted Tunes)
- 2003: Jammin' Unit & Kerosene – Izmir Acid (INEX Music Works)
- 2004: Jammin' Unit – Ali Bey (Dj.ungle Fever)
- 2007: Jammin' Unit – Unreleased Madness (Odrex Music & Naked Sound)
- 2009: Jammin' Unit / Little Nobody – Split 12-Inch, Minus Vinyl #4 (IF?)
