= Rising High Records =

British record label

Rising High Records was a leading British record label, established in 1991, specializing in rave, techno and ambient chillout music. Founded by Caspar Pound, who had chart success with A Homeboy, a Hippie and a Funki Dredd, the label went on to be at the forefront of dance music in the 1990s. The label was formed at F2 studios in London with studio owner Rob Mcluhan. Pound had recorded "Total Confusion" at F2 and decided to form his own label in partnership with the studio, teaming up with the in-house producer Pete Smith to form The Hypnotist. The label's first release "Rainbows in the Sky" became an instant hit, and was quickly followed by "The House Is Mine" and "Hardcore You Know the Score", three tracks that defined the sound of techno through the decade. Vocals and samples for all three were provided by Andy Higgins, who also ran the export and production of the label in the early years, according to Colin Larkin in The Guinness Who's Who of Rap, Dance and Techno.

Rising High licensed Frankfurt's Harthouse label to the UK, pioneering German trance music, a genre then little known in the UK; and licensed Underground Resistance for their debut UK release. Rising High was also among the first to champion hardcore techno and ambient chill-out music in the UK. In 1995 Rising High established an American branch for their label in Santa Monica, California under the Rising High USA banner, but would fold operations in 1996.

== Caspar Pound ==
Pound's step-brother is Labour MP Stephen Pound and his grandfather was the biographer Reginald Pound. Originally from Peterborough, Cambridgeshire, England, he shot to fame at age 19 with the single "Total Confusion", and then founded the Rising High and Sapho labels. As The Hypnotist he became a star in Germany, and played at the Love Parade to thousands of ravers.

Caspar Pound died from cancer in 2004 at the age of 33.

== Artists ==
Notable artists recording for the label included :

- Neutron 9000
- Peter Smith & Caspar Pound (The Hypnotist)
- A Homeboy a Hippie and a Funki Dread
- Frank Heiss
- Project One
- Union Jack
- Friends Lovers and Family
- Bedouin Ascent
- Interface
- Audio Assault
- Mixmaster Morris
- Pete Namlook
- Earth Leakage Trip
- RHC (Rising High Collective, which was Caspar Pound, Pete Smith, Marc William and Plavka)
- Signs of Chaos
- Church of Extacy
- Luke Vibert (recording as Wagon Christ and Plug)
- Knight Phantom
- Syzygy
