= David Sylvian discography =

Discography

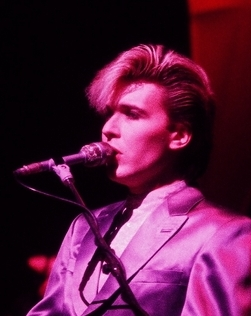
- Sylvian in November 1982
- Studio albums: 10
- EPs: 6
- Compilation albums: 5
- Singles: 15
- Video albums: 6
- Music videos: 9
- Collaborative albums: 9
- Remix albums: 2
- Box sets: 1

This is the discography for the British musician/singer-songwriter David Sylvian as a solo artist. For information about the discography of Japan, see Japan discography.

== Albums ==
=== Studio albums ===
Title	Details	Peak chart positions										Certifications
Title	Details	UK	AUS	BE (FL)	GER	IT	JPN	NL	NOR	NZ	SWE	Certifications
Brilliant Trees	Released: 25 June 1984; Label: Virgin; Formats: CD, LP, MC	4	96	—	—	23	16	7	—	37	33	UK: Gold
Alchemy: An Index of Possibilities	Released: 9 December 1985; Label: Virgin; Formats: MC	—	—	—	—	—	—	—	—	—	—	
Gone to Earth	Released: 1 September 1986; Label: Virgin; Formats: CD, 2xLP, MC	24	94	—	—	22	52	6	—	46	30	UK: Silver
Secrets of the Beehive	Released: 26 October 1987; Label: Virgin; Formats: CD, LP, MC	37	91	—	—	19	61	31	—	—	46	
Dead Bees on a Cake	Released: 29 March 1999; Label: Virgin; Formats: CD, MC, MD	31	—	44	64	20	—	66	21	—	52	
Blemish	Released: 3 May 2003; Label: Samadhisound; Formats: CD, LP, digital download	—	—	—	—	58	199	—	—	—	—	
When Loud Weather Buffeted Naoshima	Released: 6 August 2007; Label: Samadhisound; Formats: CD, digital download	—	—	—	—	—	—	—	—	—	—	
Manafon	Released: 14 September 2009; Label: Samadhisound; Formats: CD, digital download	112	—	63	—	51	—	93	—	—	50	
There's a Light That Enters Houses with No Other House in Sight	Released: 24 November 2014; Label: Samadhisound; Formats: CD, digital download	—	—	—	—	—	—	—	—	—	—	
The Distance Between the Killer and the Killing	Released: 26 February 2027; Label: Nanoq; Formats: CD, LP, digital download											
"—" denotes releases that did not chart or were not released in that territory.

=== Collaborative albums ===
==== With Holger Czukay ====
Title	Details	Peak chart positions		
Title	Details	UK	BE	NL
Plight & Premonition	Released: 21 March 1988; Label: Venture; Formats: CD, LP, MC	71	130 (Note: Charted upon re-release by Grönland Records in 2018 as a repackaged 2-CD set)	171
Flux + Mutability	Released: 4 September 1989; Label: Venture, Virgin; Formats: CD, LP, MC	—	130	171
"—" denotes releases that did not chart or were not released in that territory.

==== With Russell Mills ====
Title	Details
Ember Glance: The Permanence of Memory	Released: 4 November 1991; Label: Venture, Virgin; Formats: CD

==== With Robert Fripp ====
Title	Details	Peak chart positions	
Title	Details	UK	SWE
The First Day	Released: 5 July 1993; Label: Virgin; Formats: CD, 2xLP, MC	21	34
Darshan (The Road to Graceland)	Released: 6 December 1993; Label: Virgin; Remix album; Formats: CD, LP, MC	—	—
Damage: Live	Released: 26 September 1994; Label: Virgin; Live album; Formats: CD	—	—
"—" denotes releases that did not chart or were not released in that territory.

==== With Nine Horses ====
Title	Details	Peak chart positions	
Title	Details	UK	IT
Snow Borne Sorrow	Released: 17 October 2005; Label: Samadhi Sound	137	23
Money for All	Released: 22 January 2007; Label: Samadhi Sound; Mini-album / EP	—	—
"—" denotes releases that did not chart or were not released in that territory.

==== With Jan Bang, Erik Honoré, Arve Henriksen and Sidsel Endresen ====
Title	Details
Uncommon Deities	Released: 24 September 2012; Label: Samadhisound; Formats: CD

==== With Stephan Mathieu ====
Title	Details
Wandermüde	Released: 10 December 2012; Label: Samadhisound; Formats: CD, digital download

==== With Rhodri Davies and Mark Wastell ====
Title	Details
There Is No Love	Released: 31 May 2017; Label: Confront Recordings; Mini-album; Formats: CD

=== Compilation albums ===
Title	Details	Peak chart positions			
Title	Details	UK	BE	IT	NL
Approaching Silence	Released: 5 October 1999; Label: Virgin; Formats: CD	—	—	—	—
Everything and Nothing	Released: 9 October 2000; Label: Virgin; Formats: 2xCD, 2xMC, 2xMD	57	—	45	—
Camphor	Released: 27 May 2002; Label: Venture, Virgin; Formats: 2xCD, MC	99	—	—	—
Sleepwalkers	Released: 21 September 2010; Label: Samadhisound; Formats: CD	104	89	87	76
A Victim of Stars 1982–2012	Released: 27 February 2012; Label: Virgin/EMI; Formats: 2xCD, digital download	58	62	64	99
"—" denotes releases that did not chart or were not released in that territory.

=== Remix albums ===
Title	Details	Peak chart positions
Title	Details	IT
The Good Son vs. The Only Daughter	Released: 7 February 2005; Label: Samadhisound; Formats: CD, digital download	—
Died in the Wool – Manafon Variations	Released: 18 May 2011; Label: Samadhisound; Formats: 2xCD, digital download	98
"—" denotes releases that did not chart or were not released in that territory.

=== Box sets ===
Title	Details	Notes
Weatherbox	Released: 13 November 1989; Label: Virgin; Formats: 5xCD	Limited edition release featuring Sylvian's studio releases to that point, with the instrumental half of Gone to Earth presented in its entirety on one disc.
Samadhisound 2003–2014 – Do You Know Me Now?	Released: 4 August 2023; Label: Universal; Formats: 10xCD	Limited edition release featuring Sylvian's solo and collaborative work released on Samadhisound. Includes 100-page hardback book of essays and artwork.

== EPs ==
Title	Details	Peak chart positions
Title	Details	UK
Forbidden Colours / Nightporter	Released: 1983; Label: Virgin; Formats: 12"; Germany-only release; "Forbidden Colours" is by Sylvian and Ryuichi Sakamoto, whilst "Nightporter" is by Japan	—
Words with the Shaman	Released: 2 December 1985; Label: Virgin; Formats: 12"	72
Heartbeat (Tainai Kaiki II) (with Ryuichi Sakamoto)	Released: 1 June 1992; Label: Virgin; Formats: CD, MC	58
Godman	Released: 6 September 1999; Label: Venture, Virgin; Formats: CD	—
World Citizen (with Ryuichi Sakamoto)	Released: 8 October 2003 (Japan); 21 April 2004 (UK); Label: Warner (Japan); Samadhisound (UK); Formats: CD, digital download	—
Playing the Schoolhouse	Released: 10 October 2015; Label: Samadhisound; Formats: CD, digital download	—
"—" denotes releases that did not chart or were not released in that territory.

== Singles ==
Single	Year	Peak chart positions						Album
Single	Year	UK	AUS	FRA	ICE	IRE	JPN	Album
"Bamboo Houses" / "Bamboo Music" (with Ryuichi Sakamoto)	1982	30	—	—	—	—	63	Non-album single
"Forbidden Colours" (with Ryuichi Sakamoto)	1983	16	29	24	1	15	32	Merry Christmas, Mr. Lawrence soundtrack
"Red Guitar"	1984	17	—	—	—	13	—	Brilliant Trees
"The Ink in the Well"	1984	36	—	—	—	28	—	Brilliant Trees
"Pulling Punches"	1984	56	—	—	—	—	—	Brilliant Trees
"Taking the Veil"	1986	53	—	—	—	28	—	Gone to Earth
"Silver Moon"	1986	83	—	—	—	—	—	Gone to Earth
"Buoy" (Mick Karn featuring David Sylvian)	1987	63	—	—	—	—	—	Dreams of Reason Produce Monsters
"Let the Happiness In"	1987	66	—	—	—	—	—	Secrets of the Beehive
"Orpheus"	1988	—	—	—	—	—	—	Secrets of the Beehive
"Pop Song"	1989	83	—	—	—	—	—	Non-album single
"Heartbeat (Tainai Kaiki II)" (with Ryuichi Sakamoto)	1992	58	69	—	—	—	—	Heartbeat
"Jean the Birdman" (with Robert Fripp)	1993	68	—	—	—	—	—	The First Day
"I Surrender"	1999	40	—	—	—	—	—	Dead Bees on a Cake
"World Citizen" (with Ryuichi Sakamoto)	2003	—	—	—	—	—	34	Non-album singles
"Do You Know Me Now?"	2013	—	—	—	—	—	—	Non-album singles
"—" denotes releases that did not chart or were not released in that territory.

== Videos ==
=== Video albums ===
Title	Details
Preparations for a Journey	Released: 21 February 1985; Label: Victor; Formats: VHS, Betamax; Japan-only release
Steel Cathedrals	Released: 14 December 1985; Label: Virgin; Formats: VHS; Limited release
Red Guitar / The Ink in the Well / Silver Moon	Released: January 1987; Label: Virgin; Formats: VHS, LaserDisc
Weatherbox	Released: August 1989; Label: Virgin; Formats: VHS; Promotional release
Live in Japan (with Robert Fripp)	Released: 4 December 1994; Label: VAP; Formats: VHS, LaserDisc; Japan-only release
Amplified Gesture	Released: 23 January 2013; Label: Samadhisound; Formats: DVD

=== Music videos ===
Title	Year
"Bamboo Music"	1982
"Forbidden Colours"	1983
"Red Guitar"	1984
"The Ink in the Well"	1984
"Pulling Punches"	1984
"Silver Moon"	1986
"Orpheus"	1988
"Heartbeat (Tainai Kaiki II)"	1992
"I Surrender"	1999

== Contributions ==
Year	Song	Artist	Album	Contribution
1982	"Good Night"	Akiko Yano	Ai Ga Nakucha Ne	Vocals
1982	"Kanashikute Yarikirenai"	Akiko Yano	Ai Ga Nakucha Ne	Guitar
1982	"Demain"	Pierre Barouh	Le Pollen	Spoken words
1982	"Le Pollen"	Pierre Barouh	Le Pollen	Spoken words in conversation
1982	"Living on the Front Line"	Sandii & the Sunsetz	Immigrants	Backing vocals, synthesizer, lyrics
1982	"Where the Fire Still Burns"	Sandii & the Sunsetz	Immigrants	Backing vocals, lyrics
1982	"Illusion"	Sandii & the Sunsetz	Immigrants	Backing vocals, lyrics
1983	"Forbidden Colours"	David Sylvian and Ryuichi Sakamoto	Merry Christmas, Mr. Lawrence soundtrack by Ryuichi Sakamoto	Vocals, lyrics
1985	"p:Machinery"	Propaganda	A Secret Wish	Keyboard
1986	"This is Not Enough"	Sandii & The Sunsetz	La La La La Love~Banzai Baby	Backing vocals, keyboards, lyrics, music
1986	"Some Small Hope"	Virginia Astley	Hope in a Darkened Heart	Vocals
1986	"Buoy"	Mick Karn featuring David Sylvian	Dreams of Reason Produce Monsters by Mick Karn	Vocals, lyrics
1986	"When Love Walks In"	Mick Karn	Dreams of Reason Produce Monsters by Mick Karn	Vocals, lyrics
1986	"Land"	Mick Karn	Dreams of Reason Produce Monsters by Mick Karn	Additional keyboards
1987	"Perfect Days"	Masami Tsuchiya	Life in Mirrors	Electric guitar, piano
1992	"Heartbeat (Tainai Kaiki II) – Returning to the Womb"	David Sylvian & Ryuichi Sakamoto featuring Ingrid Chavez	Heartbeat by Ryuichi Sakamoto	Vocals, lyrics, music
1992	"Cloud #9"	Ryuichi Sakamoto	Heartbeat by Ryuichi Sakamoto	Vocals, lyrics
1992	"First Evening"	Hector Zazou	Sahara Blue	Guitar
1992	"Ophélie"	Hector Zazou	Sahara Blue	Music
1992	"Youth"	Hector Zazou	Sahara Blue	Guitar
1992	"Sahara Blue"	Hector Zazou	Sahara Blue	Walkie-talkie vocals
1992	"To a Reason"	Hector Zazou	Sahara Blue	Vocals, guitar, lyrics; credited as Mr. X
1992	"Victim of Stars"	Hector Zazou	Sahara Blue	Vocals, lyrics, music; credited as Mr. X
1992	"Lettre au Directeur des Messageries Maritimes"	Hector Zazou	Sahara Blue	Ending vocals (as Mr. X), lyrics
1995	"Come Morning"	Nicola Alesini & Pier Luigi Andreoni	Marco Polo	Vocals, lyrics, music
1995	"The Golden Way"	Nicola Alesini & Pier Luigi Andreoni	Marco Polo	Vocals, lyrics, music
1995	"Maya"	Nicola Alesini & Pier Luigi Andreoni	Marco Polo	Vocals, lyrics, music
1996	"Ti ho aspettato (I Have Waited for You)"	Andrea Chimenti	L'albero pazzo	Vocals, lyrics
1996	"How Safe Is Deep?"	Russell Mills	Undark: Strange Familiar	Vocals, lyrics, music
1997	"Penguin Freud"	Mono	Formica Blues	Sample of "Answered Prayers" from Gone to Earth
1998	"Salvation"	Ryuichi Sakamoto	Discord	Lyrics
1998	"I Was Waving at You"	Ana Voog	Anavoog.com	Music
1999	"Rooms of Sixteen Shimmers"	Russell Mills	Pearl and Umbra	Vocals, lyrics
1999	"Forbidden Colours" (New Version)	Ryuichi Sakamoto	Cinemage	Vocals, lyrics
2001	"Zero Landmine"	N.M.L. (No More Landmine) (Ryuichi Sakamoto and others)	Zero Landmine	Vocals, lyrics
2001	"Zero Landmine – Short Version"	N.M.L. (No More Landmine) (Ryuichi Sakamoto and others)	Zero Landmine	Vocals, lyrics
2001	"Sugarfuel"	Readymade FC	Bold	Vocals, lyrics
2001	"Linoleum"	Tweaker featuring David Sylvian	The Attraction to All Things Uncertain by Tweaker	Vocals, lyrics
2004	"World Citizen (I Won't Be Disappointed)"	Ryuichi Sakamoto and David Sylvian	Chasm by Ryuichi Sakamoto	Vocals, lyrics
2004	"Transit"	Fennesz	Venice	Vocals, lyrics
2004	"Pure Genius"	Tweaker featuring David Sylvian	2 a.m. Wakeup Call by Tweaker	Vocals, lyrics
2004	"Exit / Delete"	Takagi Masakatsu featuring David Sylvian	Coieda by Takagi Masakatsu	Vocals, lyrics
2004	"For the Love of Life" (Ending Theme Full Version)	Kuniaki Haishima	Monster soundtrack	Vocals, lyrics
2004	"Messenger"	Blonde Redhead	Equus	Vocals
2004	"As Long as I Can Hold My Breath"	Harold Budd	Avalon Sutra	Producer; also art director of album
2005	"A Fire in the Forest" (Remix)	Readymade FC	Babilonia	Vocals, lyrics
2005	"Matière pensante"	Hector Zazou	Quadri + Chromies	Vocals
2006	"The Librarian"	Burnt Friedman & Jaki Liebezeit featuring David Sylvian	Secret Rhythms 2 by Burnt Friedman & Jaki Liebezeit	Vocals, lyrics
2006	"Angels"	Punkt	Crime Scenes	Vocals, lyrics
2007	"Playground Martyrs"	Steve Jansen	Slope	Vocals, lyrics
2007	"Ballad of a Deadman"	Steve Jansen	Slope	Vocals, lyrics, guitar
2007	"Cancelled Pieces"	Steve Jansen	Slope	Guitar
2008	"Honor Wishes"	Joan As Police Woman featuring David Sylvian	To Survive by Joan As Police Woman	Vocals
2008	"No Question"	Joan As Police Woman featuring David Sylvian	To Survive by Joan As Police Woman	Vocals
2008	"Before and Afterlife"	Arve Henriksen	Cartography	Vocals, lyrics, sampling, programming
2008	"Thermal"	Arve Henriksen	Cartography	Vocals, lyrics
2009	"Jacqueline"	David Sylvian	The Believer (The 2009 Music Issue) by various artists	Vocals, lyrics
2010	Little Girls with 99 Lives (EP)	Ingrid Chavez	Little Girls with 99 Lives (EP)	Lyrics, music, instruments, co-producer
2012	"Nothing Is Happening Everywhere"	Land	Night Within	Vocals, lyrics
2017	"Life, Life"	Ryuichi Sakamoto	async	Vocals
2020	"Like Planets [unreel]"	Mark Wastell	None	Field recordings, poetry fragments
2022	"Grains (Sweet Paulownia Wood)"	David Sylvian	A Tribute to Ryuichi Sakamoto – To the Moon and Back	Vocals, producer
