= Sleepwalkers (David Sylvian album) =

Compilation album by David Sylvian
- Released: 21 September 2010 (Japan); 27 September 2010 (Worldwide)
- Recorded: 2001–2010
- Genre: Art pop; ambient
- Length: 67:07
- Label: Samadhi Sound

David Sylvian chronology
Manafon (2009)	Sleepwalkers (2010)	Died in the Wool – Manafon Variations (2011)

Professional ratings
Review scores
Source	Rating
AllMusic	3.5/5 stars
The Irish Times	4/5 stars
Mojo	4/5 stars
MusicOMH	4/5 stars
Pitchfork	6.0/10
Uncut	8/10

Sleepwalkers is a compilation album by David Sylvian, released in September 2010 by the label Samadhi Sound.

== Content ==
The album is a compilation of some of Sylvian's collaborations from the 2000s, and includes several tracks remixed by Sylvian as well as alternate takes. "Sleepwalkers" and "The World is Everything" appeared on a sampler CD that was included with a limited tour brochure from Sylvian's 'The World is Everything' tour in 2007. "World Citizen – I Won't Be Disappointed" with Ryuichi Sakamoto originally appeared on the 2003 EP World Citizen. However, the version on Sleepwalkers is the 'looped piano' version found on Sakamoto's 2004 album Chasm. "Five Lines" is the only new track on the album and is a collaboration with Dai Fujikura who went on to remix and influence several songs on the subsequent album Died in the Wool – Manafon Variations. The final track, "Trauma", is the only instrumental song and had been included as a bonus track to Sylvian's 2003 album Blemish.

=== Reissues ===
In June 2022, the album was reissued in Europe by Grönland Records. It was released on CD as well as for the first time as a double LP. It feature three new tracks: "World Citizen" a collaboration with Ryuichi Sakamoto originally released on the EP of the same name alongside "World Citizen (I Won't Be Disappointed)" (which is included on both the 2010 and 2022 tracklists); "Do You Know Me Now?", solely by Sylvian, which had been released as a non-album single in 2013; and "Modern Interior", a collaboration with Jan Bang that had been written and released in 2011 for the Kizunaworld Project, which was to support those affected by the Tōhoku earthquake and tsunami earlier that year. However, two tracks, "Ballad of a Deadman" and "Playground Martyrs", both collaborations with Sylvian's brother Steve Jansen, were removed from the reissue.

== Reception ==
Thom Jurek for AllMusic described the album as "provocative and compelling listen, full of moods, shapes, colors, spaces, and textures. Sylvian has created (aestehtically at least) something approaching an entirely new offering from various chapters in his recent musical past." Jess Harvell for Pitchfork wrote that Sylvian's "fearlessness, if not quite his versatility, at tackling new sounds (and even new structures) is still a beacon, especially at an age when many of his contemporaries have fossilized into post-punk heritage acts."

== Track listing ==
All lyrics are written by David Sylvian

No.	Title	Music	From the album:	Length
1.	"Sleepwalkers"	Martin Brandlmayr	The World is Everything Tour Sampler (2007)	5:16
2.	"Money for All" (Nine Horses)	Burnt Friedman	Money for All EP by Nine Horses (2007)	4:08
3.	"Ballad of a Deadman" (Steve Jansen)	Jansen	Slope by Jansen (2007)	5:31
4.	"Angels" (Punkt)	Jan Bang; Erik Honoré; Arve Henriksen; Audun Kleive	Crime Scenes by Punkt (2001)	4:00
5.	"World Citizen – I Won't Be Disappointed" (with Ryuichi Sakamoto)	Sylvian; Sakamoto	Chasm by Sakamoto (2004)	6:06
6.	"Five Lines"	Sylvian; Dai Fujikura	new song	3:52
7.	"The Day the Earth Stole Heaven" (Nine Horses)	Friedman; Tim Motzer	Snow Borne Sorrow by Nine Horses (2005)	3:17
8.	"Playground Martyrs" (Steven Jansen)	Jansen	Slope by Jansen (2007)	2:39
9.	"Exit / Delete" (Takagi Masakatsu featuring David Sylvian)	Masakatsu	Coieda by Masakatsu (2004)	3:28
10.	"Pure Genius" (Tweaker featuring David Sylvian)	Chris Vrenna; Clint Walsh	2 a.m. Wakeup Call by Tweaker (2004)	4:02
11.	"Wonderful World" (Nine Horses)	Sylvian; Jansen	Snow Borne Sorrow by Nine Horses (2005)	5:59
12.	"Transit" (Christian Fennesz)	Fennesz	Venice by Fennesz (2004)	4:52
13.	"The World is Everything"	Takuma Watanabe	The World is Everything Tour Sampler (2007)	1:43
14.	"Thermal" (Arve Henriksen)	Henriksen; Bang; Kleive; Eivind Aarset	Cartography by Henriksen (2008)	2:19
15.	"Sugarfuel" (Readymade featuring David Sylvian)	Jean-Philippe Verdin	Bold by Readymade (2001)	4:15
16.	"Trauma"	Sylvian	Blemish (2003)	5:40
Total length:				67:07

== Personnel ==
Musicians

- David Sylvian – vocals (1–15), keyboards (1, 7, 11), guitars (2, 3, 11, 16), harmonica (2), electric piano (2), electronics (16)
- Martin Brandlmayr – drums (1), vibraphone (1), marimba (1), computer (1)
- Toshimaru Nakamura – no-input mixing board (1)
- Sachiko M – sampler with sine waves (1)
- Burnt Friedman – drums (2), programming (2, 7), synthesisers (2, 7), vocoder (7)
- Hayden Chisholm – clarinet (2, 7)
- Morten Grønvad – vibraphone (2, 7)
- Daniel Schröter – double bass (2)
- Atom™ – drum programming (2)
- Tommy Blaize – backing vocals (2, 7)
- Derek Green – backing vocals (2)
- Beverlei Brown – backing vocals (2, 7)
- Andrea Grant – backing vocals (2)
- Joan Wasser – vocals (3), violin (3)
- Theo Travis – flute (3)
- Steve Jansen – drums (3, 7, 11), percussion (3, 7), synthesizers (3, 8), sampling (3, 8, 11), keyboards (7, 11), piano (8)
- Jan Bang – live sampling (4), samples (4, 14)
- Erik Honoré – synthesisers (4)
- Arve Henriksen – trumpet (4, 14)

- Audun Kleive – percussion (4, 14)
- Ingebrigt Håker Flaten – double bass (4)
- Ryuichi Sakamoto – keyboards (5), sound programming (5)
- Sketch Show – sound programming (5)
- Amadeo Pace – electric guitar (5)
- Keigo Oyamada – turntable (CDJ-800) (5)
- Jennifer Curtis – violin (6)
- Michi Wiancko – violin (6)
- Wendy Richman – viola (6)
- Katinka Kleijn – cello (6)
- Keith Lowe – bass (7), double bass (11)
- Tim Motzer – acoustic guitar (7)
- Joseph Suchy – electric guitar (7)
- Thomas Hass – saxophone (7)
- Takagi Masakatsu – all instrumentation (9)
- Chris Vrenna – all instrumentation (10)
- Stina Nordenstam – vocals (11)
- Christian Fennesz – all instrumentation (12)
- Takuma Watanabe – keyboards (13)
- Eivind Aarset – guitar (14)
- Jean-Philippe Verdin – all instrumentation (15)

Technical

- David Sylvian – producer (1, 2, 6, 7, 11, 13, 16), mixing (1, 2, 6, 7, 11, 13, 16), remixing (3, 8–10), art direction, compilation producer
- Martin Brandlmayr – producer (1)
- Burnt Friedman – producer (2, 7)
- Steve Jansen – producer (3, 8, 11), strings arrangement (3, 8), mixing (7, 11)
- Jan Bang – producer (4, 14), mixing (4, 14), arrangement (14)
- Erik Honoré – producer (4, 14), mixing (4, 14)
- Ryuichi Sakamoto – producer (5), mixing (5)
- Fernando Aponte – mixing (5)
- Dai Fujikura – orchestration (6), conducting (6)
- Takagi Masakatsu – producer (9)
- Chris Vrenna – producer (10), mixing (10)
- Christian Fennesz – producer (12), mixing (12)
- Takuma Watanabe – producer (13)
- Jean-Philippe Verdin – producer (15), mixing (15)
- Tony Cousins – mastering at Metropolis Studios
- Kristamas Klousch – cover, artwork
- Chris Bigg – design

== Charts ==
Chart (2010)	Peak position
Belgian Albums (Ultratop Flanders)	89
Dutch Albums (Album Top 100)	76
Italian Albums (FIMI)	87
UK Albums (OCC)	104
