= A Victim of Stars 1982–2012 =

2012 compilation album by David Sylvian

Compilation album by David Sylvian
- Released: UK: 27 February 2012; US: 3 April 2012
- Recorded: 1982–2012
- Genres: Art pop; art rock; ambient; alternative rock; experimental rock
- Length: 156:27
- Label: Virgin/EMI
- Producers: David Sylvian; Ryuichi Sakamoto; Steve Nye; Rain Tree Crow; David Bottrill; Steve Jansen; Burnt Friedman

David Sylvian chronology
Died in the Wool – Manafon Variations (2011)	A Victim of Stars 1982–2012 (2012)	There's a Light That Enters Houses with No Other House in Sight (2014)

Professional ratings
Aggregate scores
Source	Rating
Metacritic	85/100
Review scores
Source	Rating
God Is in the TV	4.5/5
musicOMH	5/5 stars
Pitchfork	8.2/10
PopMatters	8/10
Q	4/5 stars
Record Collector	4/5 stars
Uncut	8/10

A Victim of Stars 1982–2012 is a compilation album by David Sylvian. Released in 2012, the album features songs from his solo work, from Japan's reformation Rain Tree Crow, his collaborations with other artists such as Ryuichi Sakamoto and Robert Fripp, and from his more recent involvement in the band Nine Horses. It also features a remix of Japan's "Ghosts", released on Sylvian's 2000 compilation Everything and Nothing. The album peaked at number 58 on the UK albums chart.

Despite that fact not being mentioned anywhere on the album, "Forbidden Colours" is present in the re-recorded 1984 "Version" released as a B-side to "Red Guitar". Also, the song "Manafon" is a remixed version of the song from the album of the same name, which featured on the 2011 remix album Died in the Wool – Manafon Variations.

== Track listing ==
All tracks are written by David Sylvian, except where noted.

Disc 1
No.	Title	Writer(s)	From the album:	Length
1.	"Ghosts" (2000 Remix)		Everything and Nothing, originally from Tin Drum by Japan	3:47
2.	"Bamboo Houses" (Remix) (with Ryuichi Sakamoto)	Sakamoto, Sylvian	Everything and Nothing, originally a double A-side non-album single with Bamboo Music	5:21
3.	"Bamboo Music" (with Sakamoto)	Sakamoto, Sylvian	double A-side non-album single with Bamboo Houses	5:40
4.	"Forbidden Colours" (Version) (with Sakamoto)	Sakamoto, Sylvian	B-side single of Red Guitar, originally from Merry Christmas, Mr. Lawrence Original Soundtrack and added to Secrets of the Beehive CD in USA	5:58
5.	"Red Guitar"		Brilliant Trees	5:09
6.	"The Ink in the Well"		Brilliant Trees	4:29
7.	"Pulling Punches"		Brilliant Trees	5:02
8.	"Taking the Veil"		Gone to Earth	4:40
9.	"Silver Moon"		Gone to Earth	6:19
10.	"Let the Happiness In"		Secrets of the Beehive	5:37
11.	"Orpheus"		Secrets of the Beehive	4:51
12.	"Waterfront"		Secrets of the Beehive	3:36
13.	"Pop Song"		non-album single	4:34
14.	"Blackwater" (Rain Tree Crow)	Sylvian, Steve Jansen, Mick Karn, Richard Barbieri	Rain Tree Crow by Rain Tree Crow	4:22
15.	"Every Colour You Are" (Rain Tree Crow)	Sylvian, Jansen, Karn, Barbieri	Rain Tree Crow	4:46
16.	"Heartbeat (Tainai Kaiki II – Returning To The Womb)" (with Sakamoto featuring Ingrid Chavez)	Sakamoto, Sylvian, Arto Lindsay	Heartbeat by Sakamoto	5:17
Total length:				79:47

Disc 2
No.	Title	Writer(s)	From the album:	Length
1.	"Jean the Birdman" (with Robert Fripp)	Sylvian, Fripp, Trey Gunn	The First Day by Sylvian and Fripp	4:16
2.	"Alphabet Angel"		Dead Bees on a Cake	2:06
3.	"I Surrender"		Dead Bees on a Cake	9:25
4.	"Darkest Dreaming"	Sylvian, Djivan Gasparyan	Dead Bees on a Cake	4:01
5.	"A Fire in the Forest"	Sylvian, Christian Fennesz	Blemish	4:41
6.	"The Only Daughter"		Blemish	5:57
7.	"Late Night Shopping"		Blemish	2:54
8.	"Wonderful World" (Nine Horses)	Sylvian, Jansen	Snow Borne Sorrow by Nine Horses	6:02
9.	"The Banality of Evil" (Nine Horses)	Sylvian, Burnt Friedman	Snow Borne Sorrow	8:02
10.	"Darkest Birds" (Nine Horses)	Sylvian, Jansen	Snow Borne Sorrow	5:03
11.	"Snow White in Appalachia"	Sylvian, Christian Fennesz, Keith Rowe, Michael Moser, Werner Dafeldecker	Manafon	5:59
12.	"Small Metal Gods" (Remix)	Sylvian, Fennesz, Moser, Dafeldecker, Burkhard Stangl	Died in the Wool – Manafon Variations, originally from Manafon	5:09
13.	"I Should Not Dare (for N.O.)"	Sylvian, Fennesz, Jan Bang, Emily Dickinson	Died in the Wool – Manafon Variations	3:24
14.	"Manafon" (Remix)	Sylvian, Fennesz, Rowe, Moser, Dafeldecker	Died in the Wool – Manafon Variations, originally from Manafon	4:05
15.	"Where's Your Gravity?"	Sylvian, Bang, Eivind Aarset	new song	5:20
Total length:				76:40

== Charts ==
Chart (2012)	Peak position
Belgian Albums (Ultratop Flanders)	62
Dutch Albums (Album Top 100)	99
Italy Albums (FMI)	64
UK Albums (Official Charts)	58

== Reception ==
As presented on Sylvian's website, critical reception was very positive.

A review at Pitchfork concluded: "It's not easy to string a single narrative from A Victim of Stars-- Sylvian's career is in a permanent state of flux and reinvention. But he works best when his songwriting is pulled away from the concrete, when there's open-endedness for him to spin his focus around. But nothing here is ever wholly drawn into that world. Sylvian's role often feels like that of a curator, tugging in elements of free improvisation but never letting it overshadow, lest his absorption with songcraft, opulent orchestration, ambient electronics, and dozens of other impulses suffer."

A review on the BBC website, focusing on the outline the compilation offers, praised the beginning of Sylvian's solo career (i.e. CD1) but was more mixed about his later productions.

Writing for Pop Matters Maria Schurr noted, "As a primer for those intrigued by David Sylvian’s solo work, A Victim of Stars serves its purpose wonderfully. Yet, in some instances the selected songs fail to be as impactful as on their original releases."
