= Cartography (album) =

Studio album by Arve Henriksen
- Released: November 3, 2008
- Genre: Jazz
- Length: 42:43
- Label: ECM
- Producer: Arve Henriksen

Arve Henriksen chronology
Strjon (2007)	Cartography (2008)	Places of Worship (2013)

Cartography is an album by Arve Henriksen.

Professional ratings
Review scores
Source	Rating
All About Jazz	5/5 stars
Allmusic	4/5 stars
The Guardian	4/5 stars

== Background ==
On the album Cartography, Henriksen takes us into varied soundscapes that evoke streams of images. Together with his longtime companions Jan Bang and Erik Honore, they add all sort of sampling, processing and production to the mix.

== Track listing ==
No.	Title	Writer(s)	Length
1.	"Poverty and Its Opposite"	Arve Henriksen, Audun Kleive, Jan Bang	5:35
2.	"Before and Afterlife"	Arve Henriksen, David Sylvian, Jan Bang	6:43
3.	"Migration"	Arve Henriksen, Jan Bang	5:41
4.	"From Birth"	Arve Henriksen, Audun Kleive, Jan Bang	2:44
5.	"Ouija"	Arve Henriksen, Erik Honoré, Jan Bang	2:40
6.	"Recording Angel"	Arve Henriksen, Jan Bang	6:23
7.	"Assembly"	Arve Henriksen, Erik Honoré, Jan Bang	3:55
8.	"Loved One"	Arve Henriksen, Jan Bang	4:04
9.	"The Unremarkable Child"	Arve Henriksen, Jan Bang	2:04
10.	"Famine’s Ghost"	Part One: Henriksen, Honoré, Bang, William Brooks; Part Two: Henriksen, Kleive, Bang, Storløkken	4:28
11.	"Thermal"	lyrics: David Sylvian; music: Henriksen, Kleive, Aarset, Bang	2:27
12.	"Sorrow and Its Opposite"	Asbjørn Arntsen, Eyvind Skeie	4:29

== Personnel ==
- Arve Henriksen - trumpet, voice, field recordings
- Jan Bang – live sampling, beats programming, dictaphone, organ samples
- Erik Honoré – synthesizer, samples, field recordings, choir samples
- Eivind Aarset – guitars
- Ståle Storløkken – synthesizer, samples
- Lars Danielsson – double bass
- Audun Kleive – percussion, drums
- Vérène Andronikof – vocals
- Anna Maria Friman – voice
- Trio Mediæval – voice samples
- David Sylvian – voice, samples, programming

== Credits ==
- String arrangement, programming by Helge Sunde
- Vocal arrangements by Vytas Sondeckis
- Design by Sascha Kleis
- Treatment effects by Arnaud Mercier
- Mastered by Helge Sten
- Cover photography by Thomas Wunsch
- Linear photography by Johanna Diehl
- Recording, engineering, mixing by Erik Honoré and Jan Bang (tracks: #3–10.1, 12)
- Produced by Erik Honoré, Jan Bang
