= Punktfestivalen =

Music festival in Kristiansand, Norway

Punkt International Music Festival Punktfestivalen
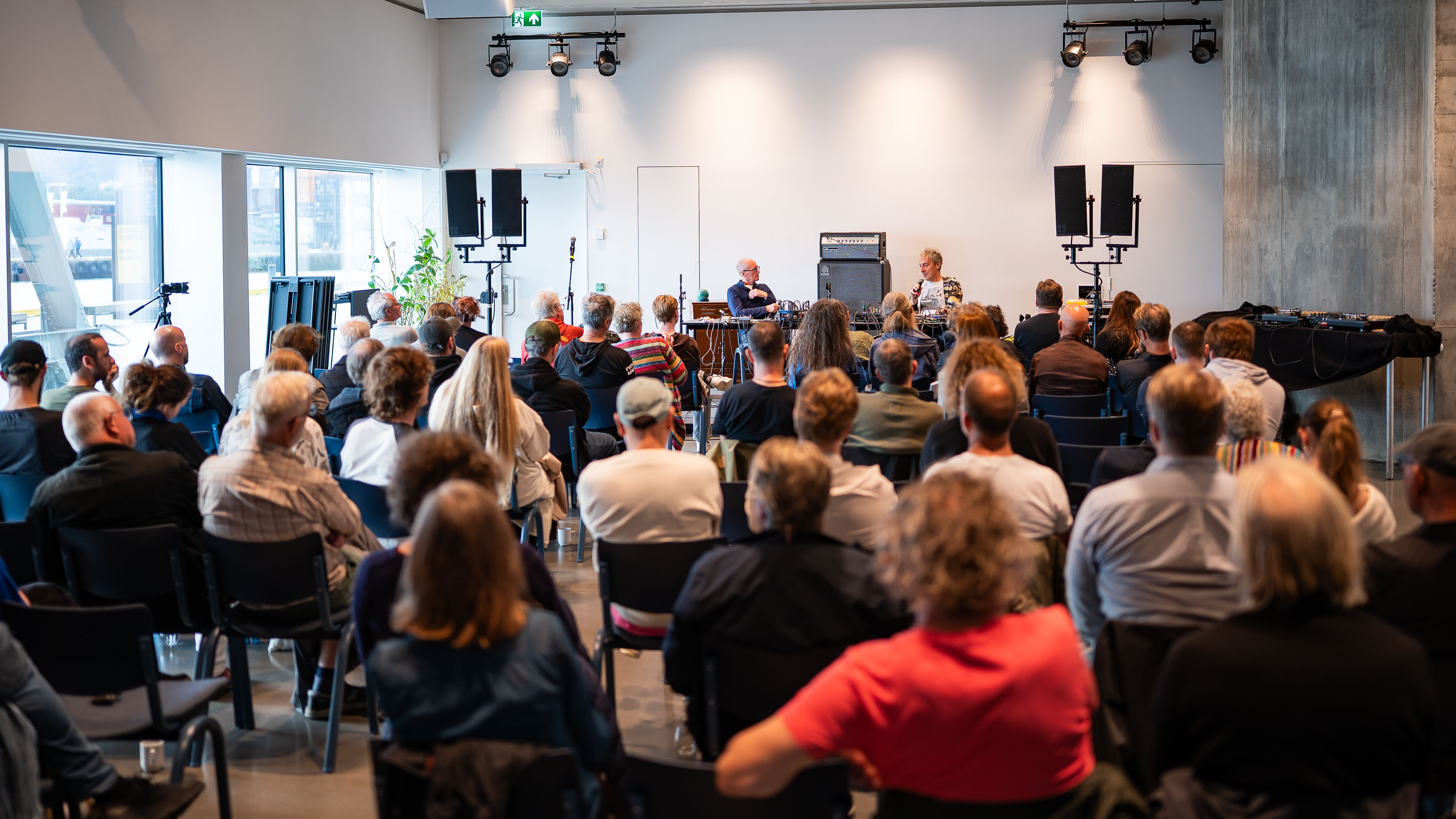
- From the seminar at Punktfestivalen 2025, curator David Toop with Oren Ambarchi
- Status: Active
- Genre: Music Festival
- Date: Early September
- Begins: 5 September 2019
- Ends: 7 September 2019
- Frequency: Annually
- Venue: Teateret, Kunstsilo
- Location: Kristiansand
- Coordinates: 58°08′39″N 7°59′42″E
- Country: Norway
- Years active: 2005–present
- Founder: Jan Bang and Erik Honoré
- Website: punktfestival.no

Punkt International Music Festival or Punktfestivalen is a music festival that has been held in Kristiansand, Norway, every year since 2005.

The festival aims to present experimental music from all over the world and provide innovative musicians an opportunity to share collective experiences. A main idea is the live sampling and remixing of the concerts on the Main Stage, with the result presented to the audience as a new concert immediately afterwards.

== Background ==
Punktfestivalen was established by the musicians Jan Bang and Erik Honoré. They have collaborated since 1980, with the specialty of Bang's live sampling and programming and Honoré's abilities as a musician, producer, and author.

Punkt quickly gained a high international reputation and was, at its launch, named “This year’s most innovative festival” by Fiona Talkington in the BBC Music Magazine. The first edition attracted coverage from Germany’s WDR, Die Zeit, Süddeutsche Zeitung, and the BBC. In 2007, BBC Radio 3 broadcast a three-day series featuring live recordings from the previous year’s festival.

Brian Eno (2008), Laurie Anderson (2014), and David Sylvian (2011) are among the international musicians who have performed at Punkt. Norwegian musicians who have appeared at the festival include Sidsel Endresen, Nils Petter Molvær, Bugge Wesseltoft, Mari Boine, Eivind Aarset, Anja Garbarek, and Arve Henriksen.

== Punkt International ==
Bang and Honoré have taken the concept abroad; as of 2024, they have visited 27 cities in Europe, Canada, and Japan. The work is supported by the Arts Council Norway, Music Norway, and the Norwegian Ministry of Foreign Affairs.

== Punkt Editions ==
Following the festival, albums—and occasionally books or artworks—are released as results of the concerts. This concept was established in 2022.

== Punkt Seminar ==
During the daytime, a seminar is held featuring discussions at the intersection of music, technology, and art. The seminar is part of Punkt’s collaboration with CreaTeME, the University of Agder’s Centre for Excellence in Creative Use of Technologies in Music Education. David Toop is a long time curator for the seminar.
