= Approaching Silence =

Compilation album by David Sylvian
- Released: 5 October 1999
- Recorded: Tracks 1, 2: September 1990, Memphis Studios, engineered at Autonomy, London – Metropolis Studios, London – Track 3: 1994, Atma Sound, Minneapolis, mixed at Synergy Studios, Napa, 1999
- Genre: Ambient
- Length: 73:45
- Label: Virgin
- Producer: David Sylvian

David Sylvian chronology
Dead Bees on a Cake (1999)	Approaching Silence (1999)	Everything and Nothing (2000)

Professional ratings
Review scores
Source	Rating
AllMusic	4/5 stars
Encyclopedia of Popular Music	3/5 stars

Approaching Silence is a compilation album of ambient music by David Sylvian (along with Frank Perry and Robert Fripp) collecting the tracks from the 1991 limited release Ember Glance: The Permanence of Memory installation soundtrack CD as well as the soundtrack cassette from the installation "Redemption" (with Robert Fripp), whose exhibition ran from 30 August 1994 to 18 September, at the P3 Gallery in Tokyo.

Approaching Silence was released on 5 October 1999 on Virgin Records (CDVE 943).

== Track listing ==
1. "The Beekeeper's Apprentice" (Perry, Sylvian) – 32:56
2. "Epiphany" (Sylvian) – 2:32
3. "Approaching Silence" (Sylvian) – 38:17

== Personnel ==
- Robert Fripp – effects (3)
- David Sylvian – art director, engineer (1, 2), instruments, sound, lights (exhibition), installation concept and creation
- Frank Perry – Noan bells, bowed Gong, Finger bells

Technical

- Yuka Fujii – art director
- Shinya Fujiwara – photography (front cover)
- Anton Corbijn – photography (back cover)
- Ari Marcopoulos – photography
- Vaughan Oliver – art design
- Chriss Bigg – design
- Martin Andersen – design
- Dave Kent – engineer (3)
- Noel Harris – engineer (1, 2)
