= Daisy Lafarge =

British poet and novelist

Daisy Lafarge (born 1992) is a Glasgow-based poet and novelist.

== Career ==
Born in Hastings, East Sussex, Lafarge studied Fine Art and History of Art at Edinburgh College of Art. She later completed a PhD in Creative Writing, Geography and Molecular Epidemiology at the University of Glasgow in 2021.

She won an Eric Gregory Award in 2017, and was runner-up in the Edwin Morgan Poetry Award in 2018. Her debut poetry book Life Without Air (Granta, 2020), was shortlisted for the T. S. Eliot Prize, and named Poetry Book of the Year in Scotland's National Book Awards.

A novel, Paul, received a pre-publication Betty Trask Award in 2019, and was later published by Granta in 2021, to critical acclaim from The Guardian, The New York Times, The Atlantic and The Irish Times.

Lafarge collaborates frequently with visual artists. In July 2021 Grönland Records announced 'ERR', a photographic essay by David Sylvian, with text by Shinya Fujiwara and an untitled original poem by Lafarge.

Lovebug, a nonfiction book exploring metaphors of love and infection, was published by Peninsula Press in 2023.

Lafarge also writes about art, ecology and literature for publications and organisations such as The New York Times and Wellcome Collection.
