= Died in the Wool – Manafon Variations =

2011 remix album by David Sylvian

Remix album by David Sylvian
- Released: Japan: 18 May 2011; UK: 23 May 2011; US: 31 May 2011
- Studio: Magic Shop, New York City
- Genre: Art pop; art rock; alternative rock; experimental rock
- Length: 74:02
- Label: Samadhi Sound
- Producer: David Sylvian

David Sylvian chronology
Sleepwalkers (2010)	Died in the Wool – Manafon Variations (2011)	A Victim of Stars 1982–2012 (2012)

Professional ratings
Review scores
Source	Rating
AllMusic	4/5 stars
All About Jazz	4.5/5 stars
Record Collector	4/5 stars

Died in the Wool – Manafon Variations is a remix album by English singer and musician David Sylvian, released in May 2011 by Sylvian's independent label Samadhi Sound. The album features six songs from Sylvian's 2009 album Manafon, which have been remixed by Dai Fujikura. The new songs are heavily influenced by Fujikura, who conducted, arranged and composed the prevalent strings sections. "I Should Not Dare" and "A Certain Slant of Light" are poems by Emily Dickinson, set to music and sung by Sylvian.

The second CD is a 18-minute long stereo mix extract from the 2008–09 Biennial of Canaries, for which Sylvian, with Fujikura, wrote a piece of music as a sound installation. The instrumental piece was over 50 minutes long and was recorded on Gran Canaria of the Canary Islands. It was mixed by Sylvian in 5:1 surround sound and mastered by Steve D’Agostino. It was inspired by a 2003 article on genetics research in the Canary Islands.

"A Certain Slant of Light" is a remix of the Sylvian's 2010 release for the Mick Karn Appeal, which is referenced in this version with the bracketed "For M.K".

== Track listing ==
All lyrics are written by David Sylvian, except where noted; composers are also shown.

Disc 1
No.	Title	Lyrics	Music	Length
1.	"Small Metal Gods"		Werner Dafeldecker, Fennesz, Michael Moser, David Sylvian, Burkhard Stangl	5:09
2.	"Died in the Wool"		Dai Fujikura, Sylvian	6:03
3.	"I Should Not Dare" (For N.O.)	Emily Dickinson	Jan Bang, Fennesz, Sylvian	3:24
4.	"Random Acts of Senseless Violence"		Dafeldecker, Fennesz, Moser, Keith Rowe, Sylvian	6:24
5.	"A Certain Slant of Light" (For M.K.)	Dickinson	Bang, Erik Honoré, Sylvian	3:28
6.	"Anomaly at Taw Head"		Sylvian, John Tilbury	5:06
7.	"Snow White in Appalachia"		Dafeldecker, Fennesz, Moser, Rowe, Sylvian	5:59
8.	"Emily Dickinson"		Fennesz, Evan Parker, Sylvian, Tilbury	3:35
9.	"The Greatest Living Englishman" (Coda)		Tetuzi Akiyama, Sachiko M, Toshimaru Nakamura, Sylvian, Otomo Yoshihide	3:06
10.	"Anomaly at Taw Head" (A Haunting)		Sylvian	3:12
11.	"Manafon"		Dafeldecker, Fennesz, Moser, Rowe, Sylvian	4:05
12.	"The Last Days of December"		Fujikura, Sylvian	6:16

Disc 2
No.	Title	Music	Length
1.	"When We Return You Won't Recognise Us"	John Butcher, Fujikura, Arve Henriksen, Günter Müller, Nakamura, Eddie Prévost, Sylvian	18:15
Total length:			74:02

== Personnel ==
Musicians

- David Sylvian – vocals, sampling (2, 6, 10), electronics (2, 6), electric guitar (3), keyboards (4, 7), acoustic guitar (4, 6)
- Keith Rowe – guitar (2, 4, 6, 7, 11)
- Erik Carlson – violin (1, 6, 7, 9, 10, 12)
- Jennifer Curtis – violin (1, 4, 6, 7, 9, 10, 12)
- Margaret Dyer – viola (1, 6, 7, 9, 10, 12)
- Christopher Gross – cello (1, 6, 7, 9, 10, 12)
- Marcio Mattos – cello (6)
- Dai Fujikura – strings conductor (1, 6, 7, 9, 10, 12), sampling (2, 11), strings arrangement (4, 6, 10, 12), strings composer (7, 9), flute conductor and arrangement (10, 12)
- Steve Jansen – cymbals (2)
- Eddie Prévost – percussion (2, 2–1)
- Kate Romano – clarinet samples (2)
- John Butcher – saxophone (2, 2–1)
- Erik Honoré – sampling (2, 5, 11), electronics (1–2), arrangement (5, 11), synthesiser (5)
- Toshimaru Nakamura – no-input mixing board (2, 6, 2–1)
- Jan Bang – sampling (2, 3, 5, 8, 11), arrangement (3, 5, 8, 11)
- Fennesz – guitar (3, 4, 7), laptop (3, 4, 7)
- Evan Parker – saxophone (3, 6, 10)
- Werner Dafeldecker – acoustic bass (4, 7)
- Michi Wiancko – violin (4)
- Wendy Richman – violin (4)
- Katinka Kleijn – cello (4)
- Michael Moser – cello (4, 7)
- John Tilbury – piano (4, 6, 7)
- Franz Hautzinger – trumpet (4, 11)
- Helge Sten – guitar samples (5)
- Arve Henriksen – trumpet samples (5), trumpet (2–1)
- Sachiko M – sine wave sampling (6)
- Christian Wallumrød – piano samples (8)
- Tetuzi Akiyama – electric and acoustic guitars (9)
- Otomo Yoshihide – turntables (9)
- Claire Chase – bass flute (10, 12)
- Laura Moody – cello (2–1)
- Günter Müller – effects (2–1)
- Emma Smith – violin (2–1)
- Jennymay Logan – violin (2–1)
- Ros Stephen – violin (2–1)
- Charlie Cross – viola (2–1)
- Vince Sipprell – viola (2–1)

Technical

- David Sylvian – art direction, record producer, mixing (all except 4)
- George Bolster – cover artwork
- Chris Bigg – design
- Dai Fujikura – mixing (1, 4, 9, 10, 12)
- Erik Honoré – mixing (5, 11)
- Jan Bang – mixing (5, 8, 11)
- Fred Kevorkian – mastering
- Ted Young – strings recording (1, 6, 7, 9, 10, 12), flute recording (10, 12)
- Rupert Coulson – recording (2–1)
