= Atmosphères (album) =

Studio album by Tigran Hamasyan
- Released: September 2, 2016
- Recorded: May 2014
- Studio: Auditorio Stelio Molo RSI; Lugano, Switzerland
- Genre: Jazz; ambient; chamber music
- Length: 1:28:55
- Label: ECM 2414/15
- Producer: Manfred Eicher

Atmosphères is a double album by jazz pianist Tigran Hamasyan recorded over three days in May 2014 and released on ECM in September 2016. The quartet features trumpeter Arve Henriksen, guitarist Eivind Aarset and producer Jan Bang.

== Background ==
The producer, Manfred Eicher, brought the quartet together after hearing an excerpt on a 2013 Deutschlandfunk radio programme of Tigran Hamasyan and Jan Bang playing together at the Punkt Festival in Kristiansand.

== Reception ==
Professional ratings
Review scores
Source	Rating
All About Jazz (Ackermann)	4/5 stars
All About Jazz (Crisafi)	4/5 stars
All About Jazz (Sullivan)	4/5 stars
All Music	3.5/5 stars
The Guardian	3/5 stars

Thom Jurek in his review for All Music says that this album is "make for a demanding listen (at least in one sitting). That said, it offers distinctive, illuminating, and abundant rewards to anyone who will encounter it on its own terms."

In The Guardian, John Fordham gave this album three stars and says that "The pairing of Hamasyan and Henriksen, meanwhile, brings an unexpectedly song-based seductiveness to an all-improv session including such hi-tech experimenters as Aarset and Bang."

== Track listing ==
All music is composed by Tigran Hamasyan, Arve Henriksen, Eivind Aarset and Jan Bang except as noted

Disc one
No.	Title	Writer(s)	Length
1.	"Traces I"		6:52
2.	"Tsirani Tsar"	Komitas Vardapet	5:49
3.	"Traces II"		4:32
4.	"Traces III"		5:45
5.	"Traces VI"		5:14
6.	"Traces V/Garun A"	Hamasyan; Henriksen; Aarset; Bang/Vardapet	12:39
7.	"Traces VI"		4:50
8.	"Garun A (Var.)"	Vardapet	3:51

Disc two
No.	Title	Writer(s)	Length
1.	"Traces VII"		9:28
2.	"Traces VIII"		5:59
3.	"Shushiki"	Vardapet	4:41
4.	"Hoy Nazan"	Vardapet	3:51
5.	"Traces IX"		5:53
6.	"Traces X"		5:56
7.	"Angel of Girona/Qeler Tsoler"	Bang	3:35
Total length:			1:28:55

== Personnel ==
- Tigran Hamasyan – piano
- Arve Henriksen – trumpet
- Eivind Aarset – guitar
- Jan Bang – samples, live sampling
