= Bamboo Houses =

Single by Ryuichi Sakamoto & David Sylvian
- A-side: "Bamboo Music" (double A-side)
- Released: 23 July 1982
- Recorded: 1982
- Genre: Electronic; avant-pop; new wave; proto‑grime; synthpop
- Length: 4:13
- Label: Virgin
- Songwriters: Ryuichi Sakamoto; David Sylvian
- Producers: Ryuichi Sakamoto; David Sylvian; Steve Nye

Ryuichi Sakamoto singles chronology
"Front Line" (1981)	"Bamboo Houses" (1982)	"Forbidden Colours" (1983)

David Sylvian singles chronology
"Bamboo Houses" (1982)	"Forbidden Colours" (1983)

Alternative cover

"Bamboo Houses" is an electronic song by Japanese musician-composer Ryuichi Sakamoto and English singer-songwriter David Sylvian, released as a single on Virgin Records in 1982. It reached number 30 on the UK charts in the second week of August 1982.

The song has been noted for its similarities to modern grime music, 20 years before the genre was founded in 2002. Fact magazine said it "accidentally predicted" grime and called it "the earliest example of proto‑grime" with elements such as a "gleaming synth lead, syncopated drumming and the type of vaguely Asian motif that would go on to define" the Sinogrime subgenre.

== Production ==
The double A-side single "Bamboo Houses" / "Bamboo Music" was the first solo project by Sylvian, released while he was still a member of the band Japan. Similarly, Sakamoto was still a member of the band Yellow Magic Orchestra at the time, though he had already done some previous solo work.

It was the second collaboration between the two, the first being the track "Taking Islands in Africa" on the 1980 Japan album Gentlemen Take Polaroids which featured Sakamoto on keyboards. The "Bamboo Houses" single in turn featured drums by Japan member Steve Jansen, who also appeared in the promo video, and was co-produced by Steve Nye.

In 1983 Sylvian and Sakamoto would team up again on "Forbidden Colours", the theme song to the Nagisa Oshima film Merry Christmas Mr. Lawrence, along with several other projects in later years.

A remix of "Bamboo Houses" was included on David Sylvian's career retrospective Everything and Nothing in 2000 and A Victim of Stars 1982–2012 in 2012.

== Track listings ==
Composed and arranged by Ryuichi Sakamoto and David Sylvian.

- UK 7" single with gatefold sleeve, Virgin Records VS 510
1. "Bamboo Houses" (7" Edit) – 4:13
2. "Bamboo Music" (7" Edit) – 4:40
- UK 12", Virgin Records VS 510-12
1. "Bamboo Houses" – 5:26
2. "Bamboo Music" – 5:38

== Critical reception ==
Smash Hits reviewer David De Lisle wrote: "An enterprising project, a stunning sleeve, two talented performers from interesting bands... This should have been single of the forthnight. In fact it's disappointing, a double A-side that are really two slow and offbeat LP tracks."

In his biography of Sylvian, Martin Power wrote, "As its title suggested, the double A-sided single was peppered with Oriental influences, from Sakamoto's gently pulsating keyboards to Sylvian's earnest lyricism."

== Legacy ==
"Bamboo Houses" has been noted for its similarities to modern grime music, 20 years before the genre was founded in 2002. Fact magazine said it "accidentally predicted" grime and called it "the earliest example of proto‑grime" with elements such as a "gleaming synth lead, syncopated drumming and the type of vaguely Asian motif that would go on to define much of Wiley and Jammer's early work" in the Sinogrime subgenre. The track has appeared on Kode9’s DJ sets and was remixed by Boxed founder Slackk, becoming "a grime touchstone" according to Fact. Sakamoto's earlier "Grasshoppers" and "The End of Asia" from his 1978 album Thousand Knives also have melodic lines similar to grime or Sinogrime.

== Chart positions ==
Chart (1982)	Peak position
UK Singles (Official Charts)	30

== Personnel ==
- Ryuichi Sakamoto – keyboards, programming, MC4, sequenced drums, marimba, spoken word (on "Bamboo Houses")
- David Sylvian – keyboards, programming, vocals, melody, bass
- Steve Jansen – percussion instruments, electronic percussion

=== Production ===
- Ryuichi Sakamoto – producer
- David Sylvian – producer, mix, cover design & layout
- Steve Nye – producer, sound engineer, mix
- Yasushi Handa – cover photography
- Yoshi Ueda – cover photography

== See also ==
- Wolverine: Adamantium Rage (1994), video game soundtrack also similar to grime
