= Jean the Birdman =

Single by David Sylvian & Robert Fripp

from the album The First Day
- B-side: Pt1: "Earthbound (Starblind)"/"Endgame"; Pt2: "Gone to Earth"/"Tallow Moon"/"Dark Water"
- Released: 16 August 1993
- Recorded: December 1992–March 1993
- Genre: Art rock · alternative rock
- Length: 4:12
- Label: Virgin
- Songwriter(s): Trey Gunn, Robert Fripp, David Sylvian
- Producer(s): David Bottrill, David Sylvian

David Sylvian singles chronology
"Heartbeat (Tainai Kaiki II)" (1992)	"Jean the Birdman" (1993)	"I Surrender" (1999)

Music video
- "Jean the Birdman" on YouTube

"Jean the Birdman" is a song recorded in 1993 by Robert Fripp and David Sylvian, and co-written by Trey Gunn. It was released on 16 August 1993 and is the only single from Fripp and Sylvian's first collaborative album The First Day (1993). It was released as two separate CDs, each including exclusive b-sides.

== Music video ==
The dreamlike music video for "Jean the Birdman" was directed by British director Howard Greenhalgh a year before he became famous for his work on Soundgarden's "Black Hole Sun". It was produced by Megan Hollister for Why Not and released on 9 August 1993. The video features an abstract caged environment harbouring a mysterious bird man.

== Exclusive B-sides ==
"Earthbound (Starblind)" was co-written by Fripp and Sylvian, and was effectively in two parts, Sylvian singing a melodic verse and chorus over a simple acoustic guitar, which then gave way to a 6-minute Fripp soundscape of guitar and Frippertronics.

"Endgame" was a simple piece, again dominated by Sylvian's verse chorus vocal over a simple acoustic guitar accompaniment. Sylvian explained: "These pieces were written after the completion of the Rain Tree Crow project. Lyrically, there is still this connection with that early material. I guess I hadn't worked the themes out of system entirely with Rain Tree Crow."

On "Tallow Moon" Sylvian spoke the lyrics of a poem. The lyrics are taken from Rimbaud's "Lettre au directeur des Messageries maritimes", released on Hector Zazou's album Sahara Blue. "Dark Water" is an ambient soundscape by Fripp.

== Track listing ==
=== Part 1 ===
1. "Jean the Birdman" (Fripp, Trey Gunn, Sylvian) - 4:12
2. "Earthbound (Starblind)" (Fripp, Sylvian) - 10:14
3. "Endgame" (Sylvian) - 2:22

=== Part 2 ===
1. "Jean the Birdman" (Fripp, Gunn, Sylvian) - 4:12
2. "Gone to Earth" (Fripp, Sylvian) - 3:04
3. "Tallow Moon" (Sylvian) - 5:44
4. "Dark Water" (Fripp) - 6:45

== Charts ==
Chart (1993)	Peak position
UK Singles (OCC)	68

== Release history ==
Region	Date	Label	Format	Catalog
United Kingdom	1993	Virgin	CD	VSC 1462
