= Heartbeat (Tainai Kaiki II) =

"Heartbeat (Tainai Kaiki II) – Returning to the Womb"

Single by David Sylvian & Ryuichi Sakamoto featuring Ingrid Chavez

from the album Heartbeat
- B-side: "Nuages"
- Released: June 1, 1992
- Genre: Art rock
- Length: 5:19
- Label: Virgin
- Songwriter(s): Arto Lindsay, Ryuichi Sakamoto, David Sylvian
- Producer(s): Ryuichi Sakamoto, David Sylvian

Ryuichi Sakamoto singles chronology
"Field Work" (1986)	"Heartbeat (Tainai Kaiki II) – Returning to the Womb" (1992)

David Sylvian singles chronology
"Pop Song" (1989)	"Heartbeat (Tainai Kaiki II)" (1992)	"Jean the Birdman" (1993)

"Heartbeat (Tainai Kaiki II) – Returning to the Womb" is a song resulting from the collaboration between Ryuichi Sakamoto and David Sylvian, with music co-written by Arto Lindsay. It features vocals by Ingrid Chavez and spoken word by John Cage. The mini-album containing the track was released in 1992 and features a previous collaboration between Sakamoto and Sylvian, the 1984 re-recording of "Forbidden Colours", produced by Steve Nye, that was the B-side to Sylvian's single "Red Guitar" and features as a bonus track on his 1987 album Secrets of the Beehive.

The song can be found on Sakamoto's album Heartbeat, in different versions depending on the issue as well as in Sylvian's compilation A Victim of Stars 1982–2012 (CD 1).

== Track listing ==
7" single
No.	Title	Writer(s)	Artist	Length
1.	"Heartbeat (Tainai Kaiki II) – Returning to the Womb"	Arto Lindsay, Ryuichi Sakamoto, David Sylvian	David Sylvian & Ryuichi Sakamoto featuring Ingrid Chavez	5:18
2.	"Nuages"	Traditional, Sakamoto (arr.)	Sakamoto	2:16

Mini-album
No.	Title	Writer(s)	Artist	Length
1.	"Heartbeat (Tainai Kaiki II) – Returning to the Womb"		David Sylvian & Ryuichi Sakamoto featuring Ingrid Chavez	5:18
2.	"Forbidden Colours"	Sakamoto, Sylvian	David Sylvian & Ryuichi Sakamoto	5:56
3.	"Heartbeat I"	Jeffrey Cohen	Sakamoto	4:41
4.	"Nuages"		Sakamoto	2:16

== Charts ==
Chart performance for "Heartbeat (Tainai Kaiki II)"
Chart (1992)	Peak position
Australia (ARIA)	69
UK Singles (OCC)	58

== Release history ==
Region	Date	Label	Format	Catalog
United Kingdom	1992	Virgin	CD, LP	VUS 57

The song was included on Sakamoto's album Heartbeat original Japanese issue in a version without Sylvian's lyrics and vocals (only sung by Lindsay).

== Reception ==
"Tainai Kaiki" was said to be "a neatly crafted pop song, mournful enough to appeal to Sylvian fans".
