= When Loud Weather Buffeted Naoshima =

Studio album by David Sylvian
- Released: 6 August 2007
- Recorded: 2006
- Studio: Samadhisound Studio, Honmura, Japan
- Genre: Ambient; avant-garde; sound collage; musique concrète
- Length: 70:23
- Label: Samadhisound; Sound CD ss0011
- Producer: David Sylvian

David Sylvian chronology
Money for All (2007)	When Loud Weather Buffeted Naoshima (2007)	Manafon (2009)

When Loud Weather Buffeted Naoshima is a limited edition CD by English musician David Sylvian that was commissioned as an installation piece by the Naoshima Fukutake Art Museum Foundation on the island of Naoshima, Japan, as part of the "NAOSHIMA STANDARD 2" exhibition which ran from October 2006 to April 2007. The album consists of one long ambient instrumental track. Writing in The Guardian, John L. Walters described it as "possibly the most avant-garde product made by a pop musician since Metal Machine Music".

The piece is an atmospheric ambient soundscape and musique concrète sound collage of found sounds. According to David Sylvian's official website:

The composition is site specific. In fact Sylvian has said that the work isn’t really complete until the sounds of the town Honmura are incorporated into the listening experience. For the Samadhisound release of When Loud Weather Buffeted Naoshima, Sylvian has incorporated some of the sounds of the island into the final mix. Whilst this obviously doesn’t compare to the experience of listening to the work in situ it goes someway towards creating an echo of it. In the process Sylvian's created a piece which might find new and interesting interpretations in a variety of unanticipated contexts.

This release will only be made available in a limited edition format (a DVD digipak beautifully designed by our own Chris Bigg with cover art by Sachiyo Tsurumi) for a limited time after which it will be deleted from the catalogue. As the Foundation have decided to make the audio a part of the permanent collection on the island, it will be there that the work will remain accessible once the samadhisound edition is ended.

The recording was performed by an ensemble of musicians: Clive Bell, Christian Fennesz, Arve Henriksen, Akira Rabelais, and David Sylvian.

David composed, recorded, and produced the work at Samadhisound studio 2006. A final mix of the material for this edition was completed in January 2007.

== Track listing ==
All tracks are written by David Sylvian

No.	Title	Length
1.	"When Loud Weather Buffeted Naoshima"	70:23
Total length:		70:23

== Personnel ==
- David Sylvian – composer, producer, mixing, art director

Ensemble:

- Clive Bell
- Christian Fennesz
- Arve Henriksen
- Akira Rabelais

== Additional personnel ==
- Chris Bigg – artwork
- Sachiyo Tsurumi – artwork
- Yuka Fujii – art director
