= World Citizen (EP) =

2003 EP by David Sylvian, Ryuichi Sakamoto

EP by David Sylvian, Ryuichi Sakamoto
- Released: October 8, 2003
- Recorded: Summer 2003, New York and New Hampshire.
- Genre: Ambient
- Label: Warner Japan; Samadhi Sound
- Producer: David Sylvian; Ryuichi Sakamoto

Alternative cover
- UK edition

World Citizen is an EP by Ryuichi Sakamoto and David Sylvian. It was originally released in Japan on October 8, 2003, before being released in the UK the following year on April 21, 2004, through Sylvian's label Samadhi Sound; the two editions have different track lists and different covers. The EP was created as part of a project called Chain Music instigated by Sakamoto. A remix of "World Citizen (I Won't Be Disappointed)" was later included on Sakamoto's 2004 solo album Chasm and Sylvian's 2010 compilation Sleepwalkers; the 2022 reissue of the latter additionally adds in "World Citizen".

The album was praised by The Guardian: "Its skewed pop recalls Bowie's Hunky Dory, and pinpoints the human cost of superpower recklessness, prompting a standing ovation for pop music's most mercurial refusenik-turned-prodigal son".

== Background ==
The songs were recorded in New York, and at Sylvian's home studio in New Hampshire in the summer of 2003. Sakamoto had approached him to contribute. Sylvian said: "I happened to be travelling at the time the request reached me so, I felt I had to turn it down. However, as the week wore on, I found myself pacing the streets of London, with the beginnings of an idea for a piece called "World Citizen". On my return to the U.S, I found the chain-music composition waiting for me. I recorded a one-take demo a week later and sent a file to Sakamoto to see if, in his opinion, the piece was worth pursuing. We spent a week putting the piece together."

Pace and Sverrisson who played on "World Citizen" were also members of the band Blonde Redhead. In 2004 Sylvian recorded vocals on an alternative version of their song "Messenger", available on the single "Equus".

== Track listing ==
All lyrics written by David Sylvian.

Japanese edition

1. "World Citizen (I Won't Be Disappointed)" (Short Version) 3:47
2. "World Citizen" (Short Version) 4:10
3. "World Citizen (I Won't Be Disappointed)" (Long Version) 6:19
4. "World Citizen" (Long Version) 6:48
5. "World Citizen" (Ryoji Ikeda Remix) 5:01

UK edition

1. "World Citizen" (Short Version)
2. "World Citizen – I Won't Be Disappointed" (Short Version)
3. "World Citizen" (Long Version)
4. "World Citizen – I Won't Be Disappointed" (Long Version)
5. "World Citizen" (Ryoji Ikeda Remix)

== Personnel ==
- David Sylvian – vocals, art direction, photography
- Ryuichi Sakamoto – keyboards
- Amedeo Pace – guitars
- Skúli Sverrisson – bass
- Steve Jansen – drums

UK edition personnel

- Yuka Fujii – art direction, design (for Osmosis)
- Atsushi Fukui – cover artwork
