= Slope (album) =

Studio album by Steve Jansen
- Released: 22 October 2007
- Recorded: The Vestry, London - Stockholm - Oslo - Straysound Studio, Sweden - Samadhisound Studios, USA - Trout Recording, Brooklyn - Blue Sky Falls, London - Slovak Radio Bratislava Studio 5, Bratislava - Milan, Italy
- Genre: Experimental rock, electronic rock, art rock, art pop, glitch, experimental pop, electropop
- Label: Samadhi Sound
- Producer: Steve Jansen

Slope is the debut solo album by drummer Steve Jansen, released in 2007 by Samadhi Sound. The album includes guest musicians and was recorded all over the world.

Jansen said: "With this album I approached composition attempting to avoid chord and song structures and the usual familiar building blocks. Instead I wanted to piece together unrelated sounds, music samples, rhythms and 'events' in an attempt to deviate from my own trappings as a musician."

== Track listing ==
1. "Grip" (Jansen) 6:42
2. "Sleepyard" (Jansen, Tim Elsenburg) 5:13
3. "Cancelled Pieces" (Jansen, Anja Garbarek) 3:20
4. "December Train" (Jansen) 4:14
5. "Sow the Salt" (Jansen, Thomas Feiner) 5:49
6. "Gap of Cloud" (Jansen) 2:45
7. "Playground Martyrs" (Jansen, David Sylvian) 3:02
8. "A Way of Disappearing" (Jansen) 1:57
9. "Ballad of a Deadman" (Jansen, Sylvian) 6:25
10. "Conversation Over" (Jansen) 5:07
11. "Life Moves On" (Jansen) 2:25
12. "Playground Martyrs (Reprise)" (Jansen, Sylvian) 3:01

== Personnel ==
- Steve Jansen - drums, acoustic and electronic percussion, sampled instruments, synth, piano (5—8, 11–12), guitar (5, 9), string arrangements (7, 9, 11–12)
- David Sylvian - guitar (3, 9), vocals (7, 9)
- Theo Travis - sax (1, 2, 10), flute (6, 9), clarinet (8)
- Tim Elsenburg - vocals, guitar and electric piano (2)
- Anja Garbarek - vocals (3)
- Thomas Feiner - vocals, mandolin and sampler (5)
- Bratislava Movie Orchestra, arranged and conducted by Ingo Frenzel (5)
- Joan Wasser - vocals and violin (9)
- Alberto Tafuri - piano ("Second Piano Cycle") (11)
- Nina Kinert - vocals (12)

Production

- Recorded by Steve Jansen and parts by Steve D'Agostino, David Sylvian (himself), Tim Elsenburg (himself), John Mallison (Anja Garbarek), Ján Machut and Ladislav Krajãoviã (orchestra), Alberto Tafuri (himself in 1985), Love Olzon (Nina Kinert)
- Mixed by Steve Jansen (exc. orchestra mixed by Ingo Frenzel)
- Mastered by Tony Cousins
- Cover art direction by David Sylvian
- Cover design by Chris Bigg
- Models created and photographed by Dan McPharlin
