= Heartbeat (Ryuichi Sakamoto album) =

Studio album by Ryuichi Sakamoto
- Released: October 21, 1991
- Genre: Synthpop, experimental rock
- Label: Virgin Records America
- Producer: Ryuichi Sakamoto, David Sylvian (11, 12), Satoshi Tomiie (track 1)

Ryuichi Sakamoto chronology
| The Sheltering Sky (1990) | Heartbeat (1991) | Little Buddha (1994) |

Professional ratings
Review scores
| Source | Rating |
|---|---|
| AllMusic | 3/5 stars |

Heartbeat is the ninth solo studio album by Ryuichi Sakamoto, released in 1991 by Virgin Records. A second version of the album was released in the United States and Europe in 1992, which replaced the original version of "Tainai Kaiki" with the David Sylvian-featuring version, "Heartbeat (Tainai Kaiki II) - Returning to the Womb", as well as English versions of "High Tide" and "Sayonara", and bonus song "Cloud #9".

== Track listing ==
Japanese version
| No. | Title | Writer(s) | Length |
|---|---|---|---|
| 1. | "Heartbeat" | Ryuichi Sakamoto, Satoshi Tomiie, Jeffrey Cohen | 4:46 |
| 2. | "Rap the World" | Sakamoto, Jungle DJ Towa Towa, Super DJ Dmitry | 4:53 |
| 3. | "Triste" | Sakamoto, FFF, Marco Prince | 4:23 |
| 4. | "Lulu" | Sakamoto | 4:19 |
| 5. | "High Tide" (sung in Japanese) | Sakamoto | 4:47 |
| 6. | "Song Lines" | Sakamoto | 2:56 |
| 7. | "Nuages" | (Traditional) | 2:15 |
| 8. | "Sayonara" (sung in Japanese) | Sakamoto | 5:24 |
| 9. | "Borom Gal" | Sakamoto | 3:59 |
| 10. | "Epilogue" | Sakamoto | 3:42 |
| 11. | "Tainai Kaiki II" | Sakamoto, Arto Lindsay | 5:20 |
| Total length: | | | 46:43 |

International version
| No. | Title | Writer(s) | Length |
|---|---|---|---|
| 1. | "Heartbeat" | Ryuichi Sakamoto, Satoshi Tomiie, Jeffrey Cohen | 4:46 |
| 2. | "Rap the World" | Sakamoto, Jungle DJ Towa Towa, Super DJ Dmitry | 4:53 |
| 3. | "Triste" | Sakamoto, FFF, Marco Prince | 4:23 |
| 4. | "Lulu" | Sakamoto | 4:19 |
| 5. | "High Tide" (sung in English) | Sakamoto | 4:47 |
| 6. | "Song Lines" | Sakamoto | 2:56 |
| 7. | "Nuages" | (Traditional) | 2:15 |
| 8. | "Sayonara" (sung in English) | Sakamoto | 5:24 |
| 9. | "Borom Gal" | Sakamoto | 3:59 |
| 10. | "Epilogue" | Sakamoto | 3:42 |
| 11. | "Heartbeat (Tainai Kaiki II) - Returning to the Womb" | Sakamoto, David Sylvian, Arto Lindsay | 5:20 |
| 12. | "Cloud #9" | Sakamoto, Sylvian | 5:17 |
| Total length: | | | 52:00 |

== Personnel ==
Performers

- Ryuichi Sakamoto – keyboards, piano, lead vocals (5, 8)
- Steven Bernstein – trumpet (1, 3, 4)
- Dee Dee Brave – vocals (1, 8)
- Satoshi Tomiie – percussion (1, 3, 4, 5, 8)
- Magic Dick – harmonica
- Marco Prince – vocals (3)
- John Lurie – sax (4)
- Debra Barsha – backing vocals (4)
- Arto Lindsay – vocals (5)
- Houria Aïchi – vocals (7)
- Youssou N'Dour – vocals (9)
- Bill Frisell – guitar (11, 12)
- Ingrid Chavez – vocals (11, 12)
- John Cage – voice (11)
- David Sylvian – vocals (11, 12)

Technical

- Lolly Grodner – engineer (11, 12)
- Patrick Dillett – engineer (all tracks except 12)
- Yoshifumi Iio – engineer (all tracks except 11, 12)
- Jungle DJ Towa Towa – co-producer (2)
- Axel Niehaus – assistant engineer (all tracks except 11, 12)
- Fernando Aponte – assistant engineer (all tracks except 11, 12)
- Jim Caruana – assistant engineer (11, 12)
- Koichiro Nagao – assistant engineer (all tracks except 11, 12)
- Wes Naprstek – assistant engineer (all tracks except 11, 12)

== Charts ==
Chart performance for Heartbeat
| Chart (1992) | Peak position |
|---|---|
| Australian Albums (ARIA) | 94 |
