= Ember Glance: The Permanence of Memory =

Studio album by David Sylvian and Russell Mills
- Released: 4 November 1991
- Recorded: September 1990, Memphis Studios, engineered at Autonomy, London – Metropolis Studios, London
- Genre: Ambient
- Length: 35:16
- Label: Venture, Virgin
- Producer: David Sylvian and Russell Mills

David Sylvian chronology
Rain Tree Crow (1991)	Ember Glance: The Permanence of Memory (1991)	The First Day (1993)

Box cover

Professional ratings
Review scores
Source	Rating
Allmusic	3/5 stars
Encyclopedia of Popular Music	3/5 stars

Ember Glance: The Permanence of Memory is the soundtrack of a collaboration between David Sylvian and Russell Mills.

The pieces were written to accompany an installation of sculpture and experimental exhibitions, conceived and produced by national and international artists at the invitation of Tokyo Creative '90, staged at the "Space FGO-Soko" in the Temporary Museum, Tokyo Bay, Shinagawa, which ran from 29 September to 12 October 1990.

Accompanying the album is a catalog/book of 96 pages which chronicles the entire installation as well as biographical history of both artists about the installation. The music is ambient and moody and consists of two instrumental tracks. Both tracks are available on the 1999 Sylvian ambient compilation Approaching Silence.

== Track listing ==
1. "The Beekeeper's Apprentice" (Sylvian, Perry) 32:52
2. "Epiphany" (Sylvian) 2:24

== Personnel ==
- David Sylvian – instruments, engineer, sound, lights (exhibition), installation concept and creation
- Russell Mills – box design, sound, lights (exhibition), installation concept and creation
- Noel Harris – engineer
- Frank Perry – Noan bells, bowed Gong, Finger bells

== Additional personnel and exhibition's personnel ==
- Yuka Fujii – project co-ordinator (for Opium Arts)
- Richard Chadwick, Natasha White – co-ordinating assistants
- David Buckland – photographic treatments and advisors
- Ian Walton – enclosure canvas and installation collaboration
- Kendall Wrightson – technical advisor, assistant
- Kiyofumi Terui – installation construction supervisor
- Miki Maeda – lighting
- Yoshihide Murao – sound
- Naoki Tachiwaka – producer
- Yasuaki Kujuro – co-producer
- Shigenori Kashimura, Tsutomu Mori – project co-ordinators (Japan)
- Kunihoko Yoshimeki – sponsorship (for Tokyo Creative)
