= There's a Light That Enters Houses with No Other House in Sight =

Studio album by David Sylvian
- Released: 24 November 2014
- Genre: Experimental, spoken word
- Length: 1:04:22
- Label: Samadhi Sound
- Producer: David Sylvian

David Sylvian chronology
A Victim of Stars 1982–2012 (2012)	There's a Light That Enters Houses with No Other House in Sight (2014)

There's a Light That Enters Houses with No Other House in Sight is the eighth studio album by David Sylvian, consisting of a single hour-length composition. It features spoken word by Pulitzer Prize winning poet Franz Wright (who died under a year after the release of the album), as well as contributions from electronic multi-instrumentalist Fennesz and pianist John Tilbury. The album was produced by Sylvian, and was released on his Samadhisound label in November 2014.

== Track listing ==
All tracks are written by David Sylvian, with prose poems from Kindertotenwald by Franz Wright

No.	Title	Length
1.	"There's a Light That Enters Houses with No Other House in Sight"	64:22
Total length:		64:22

== Personnel ==
=== Musicians ===
- David Sylvian – piano, sampler, computer, electronics, laptop
- Christian Fennesz – guitar, laptop
- John Tilbury – piano
- Franz Wright – spoken word

=== Production ===
- Chris Bigg – design
- Tony Cousins – mastering
- Nicholas Hughes – cover photography
- Alfred A. Knopf – recording arrangement
- David La Spina – photography
- David Sylvian – art direction, engineering, production

== Reception ==
The album was listed among the best records of 2014 by Bruno Letort of France Musique. A review at The Free Jazz Collective noted that the album marked a new step in Sylvian's exploration of the spoken word.

A review at Tiny Mix Tapes called the music "an ultra-slow jazz" while Steve Smith in the Boston Globe wrote that it "murmur[ed] in edgy assent". Joe Muggs of the Arts Desk found, "It smells of coal and leather, it looks at you through heavy-lidded eyes, it drifts into companionable reveries, before doing scary things to make sure you're still listening." A review by Phil Barnes at AllAboutJazz concluded, "Let's be clear, many are not going to be able to cope with a record with this much ambition, love of language and filmic improvisation. Reviews have been sharply divided between the ecstatic and the hatchet job -but for those prepared to listen this is an intriguing, emotionally unsettling, piece that will challenge, defying categorisation and analysis for many years to come."
