= Manafon (album) =

Studio album by David Sylvian
- Released: 14 September 2009
- Recorded: between 2004–2007 in Vienna, Tokyo, London
- Genre: Avant-garde
- Length: 49:48
- Label: Samadhi Sound
- Producer: David Sylvian

David Sylvian chronology
When Loud Weather Buffeted Naoshima (2007)	Manafon (2009)	Sleepwalkers (2010)

Professional ratings
Aggregate scores
Source	Rating
Metacritic	80/100
Review scores
Source	Rating
AllMusic	4.5/5 stars
musicOMH	3/5 stars
Pitchfork	7.4/10
Slant Magazine	2.5/5 stars
Uncut	5/5 stars

Manafon is the seventh full-length studio album by David Sylvian, released on 14 September 2009 by the Samadhisound label. It is an avant-garde work combining elements of free improvisation, experimental rock and chamber music. It reached rank No. 6 in The Wire's list of best 2009 albums.

== Production ==
Manafon was recorded over a three-year period in Vienna, Tokyo and London. Of the recording process, Sylvian said:

"There was nothing written when we went into the studio – this was very much free improvisation. So, the selection of the group of musicians for each improvisation was paramount. I recognized on the day which pieces could work for me. The process was that I took the material away and then wrote and recorded the vocal line over in a couple of hours. So I couldn't analyze my contribution and that in a way was my form of improvisation – and I enjoyed the rapidity of response."

"I take the sessions and work on them at a later time. I attempt to 'improvise' lyrics and melodies as I go, writing and recording all in a matter of hours. The basic tracks themselves undergo little or no editing as such. The structure pretty much remains as given from the original sessions. I might add an introduction or overdub other elements onto the original take. Here's a couple of examples: "Senseless Violence": Recorded in Vienna with Rowe/Polwechsel/Fennesz. I added guitar parts then layered Tilbury's piano into the track then added the vocal and an introduction. "Greatest Living Englishman: Initial take" suggested acoustic guitar overdubs which I requested of Otomo and Tetuzi on the spot. I later cut and pasted some interesting turntable activity from an alternate take onto this track. I also added an introduction by cutting and pasting elements from an earlier take. Tilbury was added to the coda. Melody and vocals added. "Rabbit Skinner": no editing. Added acoustic guitar myself then vocals."

== Lyrical inspiration ==
For the recording of Manafon, Sylvian was also inspired by the Welsh poet R. S. Thomas: lyrics often reflect the main themes written by the poet and the title of the album refers indeed to a Welsh namesake village (in north Powys) in which Thomas lived for a while.

"Manafon is indeed a village in Wales, a village in which Thomas lived for sometime and served as rector to the parish. In this small village, Thomas had trouble filling the pews of a Sunday but in a sense it was something of an idyllic spot in which to raise a child (a strict, taciturn and somewhat indifferent parent), master his profession and write his poetry. So, the physically real village became for me a metaphor for the poetic imagination.", said Sylvian.

The 7th track refers to Emily Dickinson, whose poems Sylvian would later use: "A Certain Slant Of Light" and "I Should not Dare (for N.O)" would be part of Died in the Wool in 2010, while "I Measure Every Grief I Meet" would appear on a 2024 recording read by Sylvian.

== Track listing ==
All tracks are written by David Sylvian.

No.	Title	Length
1.	"Small Metal Gods"	5:49
2.	"The Rabbit Skinner"	4:41
3.	"Random Acts of Senseless Violence"	7:06
4.	"The Greatest Living Englishman"	10:55
5.	"125 Spheres"	0:29
6.	"Snow White in Appalachia"	6:35
7.	"Emily Dickinson"	6:25
8.	"The Department of Dead Letters"	2:25
9.	"Manafon"	5:23
Total length:		49:48

Vinyl and Japanese CD bonus track
No.	Title	Length
10.	"Random Acts of Senseless Violence" (Remixed by Dai Fujikura)	6:24
Total length:		56:12

A limited edition boxed set came with a DVD of the album in 5.1 Surround Sound, and a feature-length making-of documentary, Amplified Gesture.

== Personnel ==
=== Musicians ===
- David Sylvian – vocals (all tracks except 8), acoustic guitar (2), keyboards (3, 6), electronics (5, 7, 8)
- Christian Fennesz – laptop, guitar (exc. 4)
- Werner Dafeldecker – acoustic bass (1, 3, 5, 6, 9)
- Michael Moser – cello (1, 3, 6, 9)
- Toshimaru Nakamura – no input mixer (1, 4)
- Otomo Yoshihide – turntables (1, 3, 4), acoustic guitar (right channel) (4)
- Burkhard Stangl – guitar (1, 5)
- John Tilbury – piano (2–4, 6–8)
- Evan Parker – saxophone (2, 7, 8)
- Joel Ryan – tape signal processing (2, 7, 8)
- Marcio Mattos – cello (2, 8)
- Keith Rowe – guitar (3, 6, 9)
- Franz Hautzinger – trumpet (3, 9)
- Tetuzi Akiyama – electric and acoustic guitar (left channel) (4)
- Sachiko M. – sine waves (4)

=== Production ===
- David Sylvian – production, engineering, mixing, art direction
- Additional engineers: Christoph Amann (Vienna), Toshihiko Kasai (Tokyo), Sebastian Lexer, Neil Tucker (London)
- Yuka Fujii – art direction
- Chris Bigg – design
- Atsushi Fukui – David Sylvian portrait and related drawings
- Ruud van Empel – cover artworks (Study in Green N° 1, 5, 8 (2003), Study in Green N° 16 (2004) courtesy Flatland Gallery, Utrecht)
