= Arve Henriksen =

Norwegian trumpeter (born 1968)

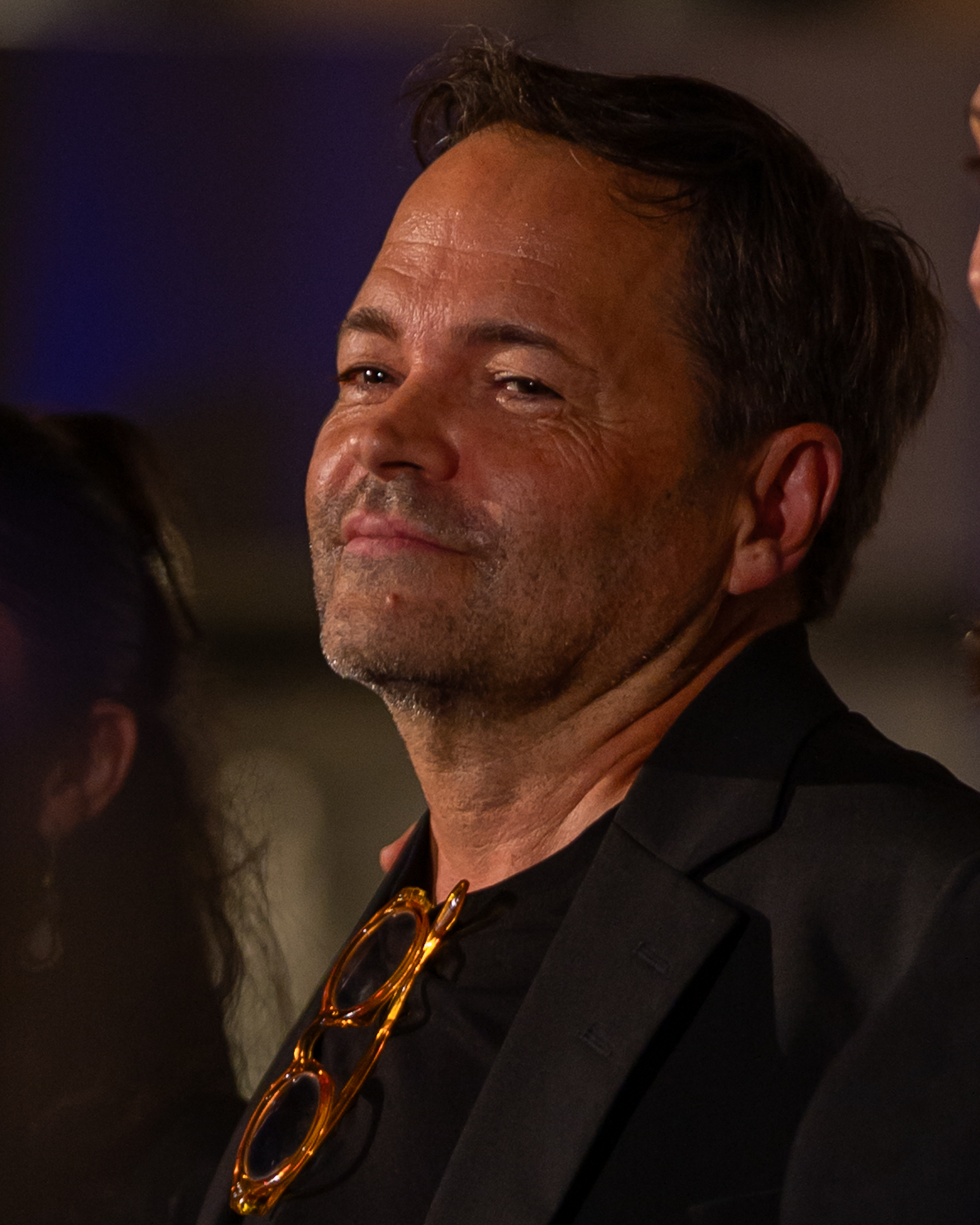
- Arve Henriksen at Punktfestivalen in Norway, September 2025

Background information
- Born: 22 March 1968 (age 58); Stranda Municipality, Sunnmøre, Norway
- Occupation: Musician
- Instruments: Trumpet, vocals
- Labels: ECM, Rune Grammofon
- Website: arvehenriksen.com

Arve Henriksen (born 22 March 1968) is a Norwegian trumpeter.

== Career ==
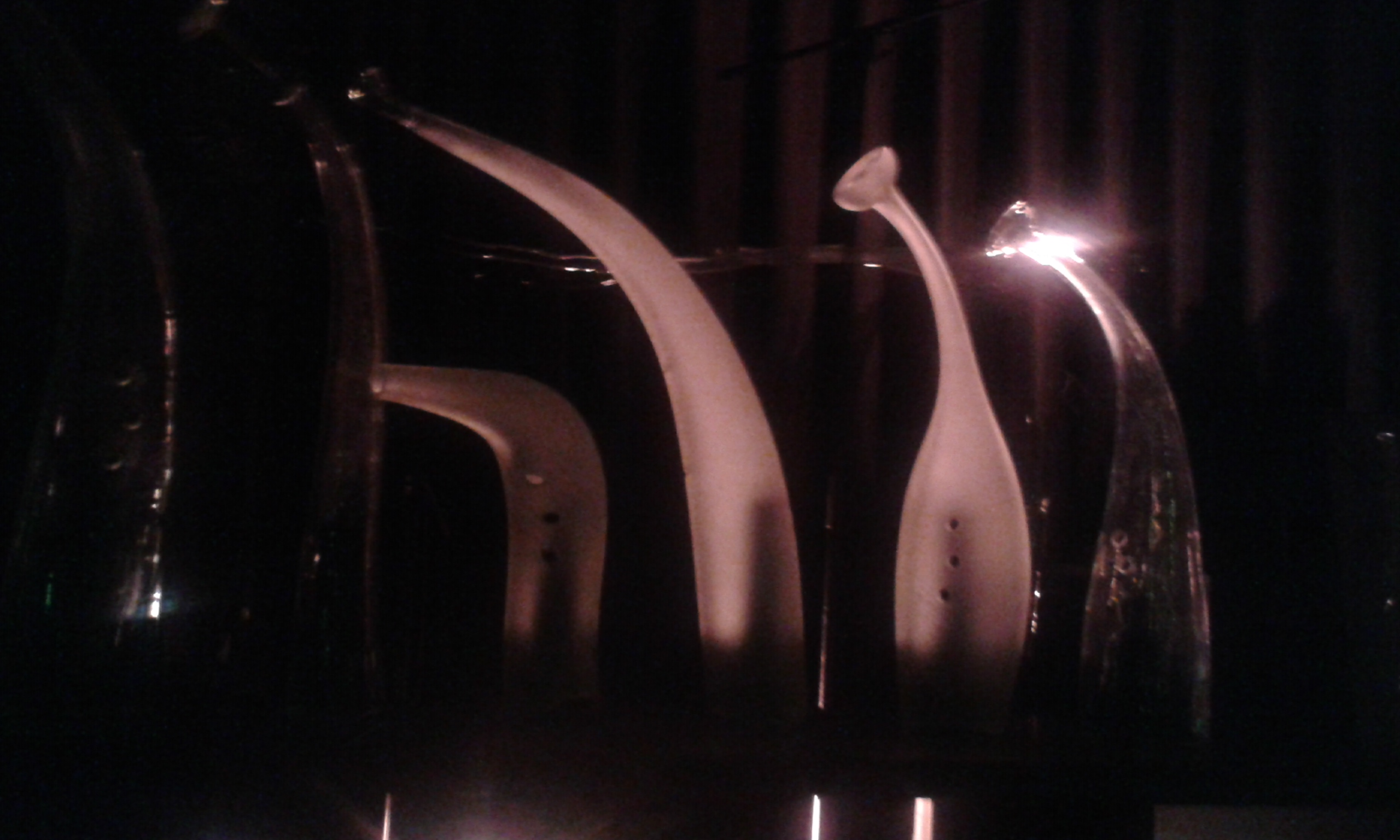
Arve Henriksen - Glass music.

Henriksen was born in Stranda Municipality and educated on the Jazz program at Trondheim Musikkonservatorium; he later studied music pedagogy, while he played in Bodega Band (1987–88), Luft (1987–89), Veslefrekk from 1989, Close Enough 1990–92, Nutrio from 1990, and recorded with Bjørn Alterhaug and Tre Små Kinesere (1990). After graduating in 1991, he joined the Trio Midt-Norge and Piggy Bop.

He has played with Misha Alperin, Jon Balke's Magnetic North Orchestra, Nils Petter Molvær, Audun Kleive, Trygve Seim, Terje Isungset, Christian Wallumrød and recently with Iain Ballamy's Food for Quartet and Supersilent, both bands signed on Rune Grammofon. He has also contributed to David Sylvian's Nine Horses project and his work, When Loud Weather Buffeted Naoshima.

He also sings; his wordless vocalising was central to Chiaroscuro, where he often sings in a soprano's range. The control over his head voice is such that in "Opening Image" he could quite easily be mistaken for a woman.

With Supersilent he has been a member of the improvisational band over the last 14 years in Norway, with collaborations with Terje Rypdal among others. John Paul Jones played with them at Punktfestivalen 2010, in Kristiansand, Norway and again at Moldejazz 2012.

John Kellman of the All About Jazz magazine recognized the Arve Henriksen/Jan Bang Double CD Release Show at The Punkt Festival, Kristiansand, Norway, September 2013, as no. 17 of his "Best Live Shows of 2013".

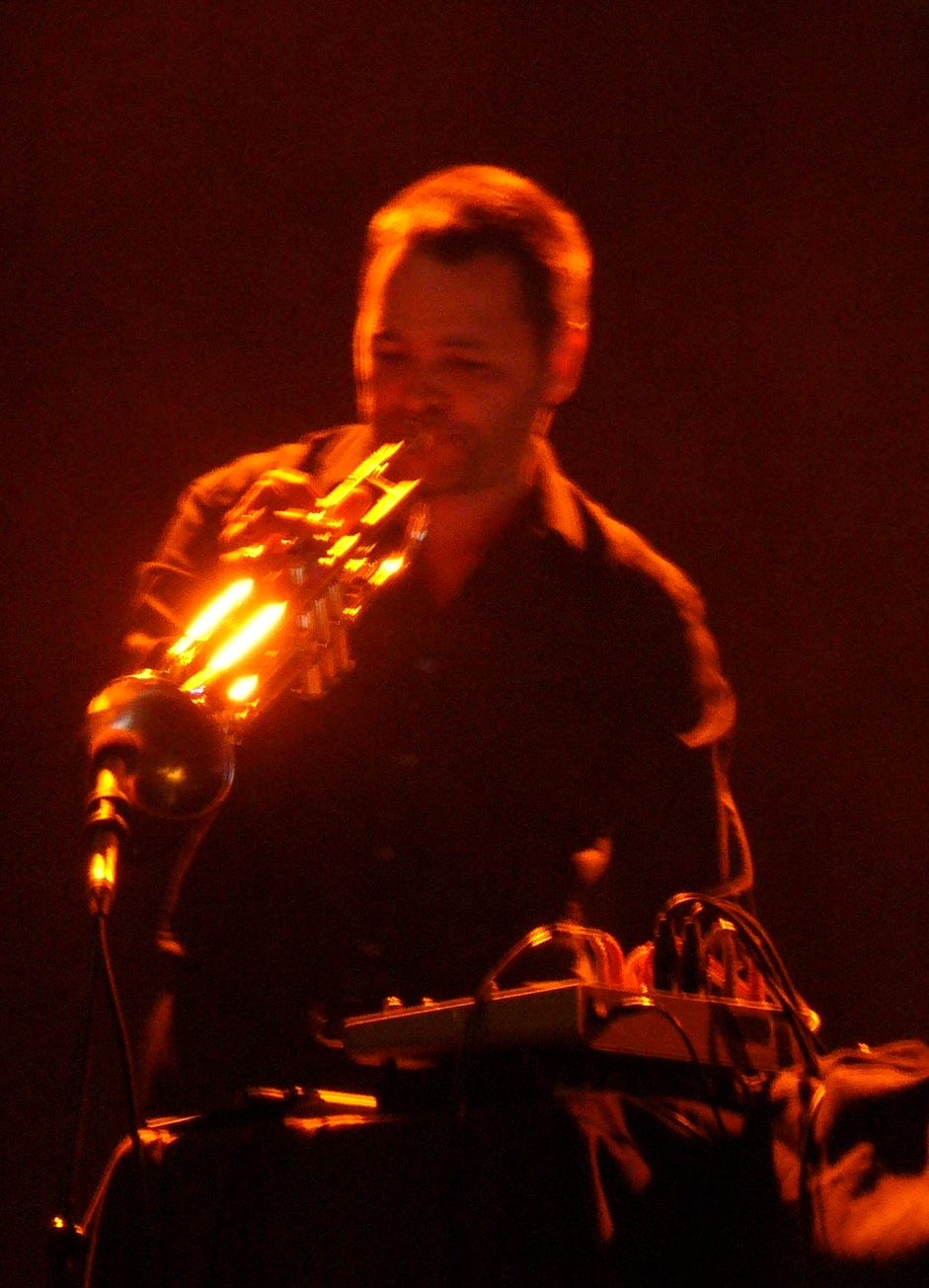
Arve Henriksen at Vossajazz 2014.

== Honors ==
- 2005: Buddyprisen
- 2007: Radka Toneff Memorial Award
- 2011: Kongsberg Jazz Award
- 2011: Paul Acket Award, North Sea Jazz
- 2016: Dr Honoris Causa at Gothenburg University

== Discography ==
=== Solo albums ===
- 2001: Sakuteiki (Rune Grammofon)
- 2004: Chiaroscuro (Rune Grammofon)
- 2007: Strjon (Rune Grammofon)
- 2008: Cartography (ECM Records)
- 2013: Places Of Worship (Rune Grammofon)
- 2014: The Nature Of Connections (Rune Grammofon)
- 2014: Chron (Rune Grammofon)
- 2014: Cosmic Creation (Rune Grammofon)
- 2017: Towards Language (Rune Grammofon)
- 2018: The Height Of The Reeds (Rune Grammofon)
- 2018: Composograph: A Synthesis Of Wood, Metal And Electronics (Arve Music)
- 2019: The timeless nowhere (Rune Grammofon)
- 2021: Mental Fatigue (Arve Music)
- 2021: Murimorphosis (Arve Music)
- 2024: Touch of Time (ECM) with Harmen Fraanje

=== Collaborative work ===
- 2000: Daa (NorCD), with Terje Isungset and Karl Seglem
- 2000: Birth Wish (Pan M Records), with Christian Wallumrød, Jan Bang and Erik Honoré
- 2007: Sketches Of Spain (Nor Wind Records), with The Norwegian Wind Ensemble and Maria Schneider
- 2009: Ellivan (NorCD), with Elling Vanberg
- 2010: Clinamen (Off, Rat), with Giovanni Di Domenico and Tatsuhisa Yamamoto
- 2012: Black Swan (Rat Records), with Teun Verbruggen
- 2012: Uncommon Deities (P-Vine Records), with Jan Bang, Erik Honoré, David Sylvian and Sidsel Endresen
- 2012: Distare Sonanti (and/OAR), with Giovanni Di Domenico and Tatsuhisa Yamamoto
- 2014: World Of Glass (All Ice Records), with Terje Isungset
- 2016: Atmosphères with Tigran Hamasyan, Eivind Aarset, and Jan Bang (ECM)
- 2017: Rímur with Trio Mediæval (ECM)
- 2017: The Art Of Irrigation (All Ice Records), with Terje Isungset
- 2018: Pilgrim (ACT), with Janne Mark
- 2018: Illusion Of A Separate World with David Kollar (Hevhetia)

Awards
Preceded by Bugge Wesseltoft	Recipient of the Buddyprisen; 2005	Succeeded by Paal Nilssen-Love
Preceded by Solveig Slettahjell	Recipient of the Radka Toneff Memorial Award; 2007	Succeeded by Elin Rosseland
Preceded by Maria Kannegaard	Recipient of the Kongsberg Jazz Award; 2011	Succeeded by Ola Kvernberg
