= Shin'ya Fujiwara =

Japanese photographer

Shinya Fujiwara (藤原 新也, Fujiwara Shin'ya; born March 4, 1944 in Moji-ku, Kitakyūshū) is a Japanese photographer.
