= Dai Fujikura =

Japanese composer (born 1977)

- Born: 27 April 1977 (age 49); Osaka, Japan
- Other name: 藤倉 大
- Occupation: composer
- Website: www.daifujikura.com

Dai Fujikura (Japanese: 藤倉 大 Fujikura Dai; born 27 April 1977) is a Japanese-born composer of contemporary classical music.

== Biography ==
Dai Fujikura was born in 1977 in Osaka, Japan. He moved to London when he was 15 to study at Dover College as a music scholar to complete his secondary education. His initial ambition was to compose music for cinema. Studying the music of Pierre Boulez, György Ligeti and Tōru Takemitsu at Trinity College of Music caused a gestalt shift: Dai became an aspiring contemporary composer whose extensive knowledge of cinematography gave his music a fresh, individual voice. Imagining sounds as images produced music with considerable dramatic structure and strength. By the end of his second year, he had already won the Serocki International Composers Competition. Before graduating, Dai's music has been broadcast on many European radio stations, won several other prizes, and has been performed by a list of illustrious ensembles and soloists including the London Sinfonietta.

Despite this fortuitous start, and the strength of early works such as Frozen Heat, Cari4nics and Eternal Escape, Dai wanted to develop his technique. A visit to Darmstadt, where he first heard Japanese traditional music, and a Masters with Edwin Roxburgh at the Royal College of Music helped Dai embrace this musical heritage, composing works like Okeanos Breeze for a mix of Japanese and Western instruments. Whilst at the Royal College of Music, he was also mentored by Péter Eötvös, writing Fifth Station for the London Sinfonietta.

This period denotes an important phase in the development of Dai's music. He experiments with spatial separation, a technique where he breaks up the traditional seating of the orchestra, sometimes placing them around the auditorium for both aural and dramatic effect. The first orchestral work using this technique was Calling Timbuktu (2nd prize Takemitsu Competition 2003) has been performed by the Tokyo Philharmonic and BBC Symphony Orchestras. Also, he starts to experiment with video, writing teki and moromoro for solo piano and film. Research into spatial separation, and cinematographic musical structures continued at King's College London under George Benjamin, leading to a PhD.

A portrait concert by the Philharmonia Orchestra (part of the RFH Music of Today series with Martyn Brabbins), retrospectives in New York and Chicago, work with Ensemble Modern, Klangforum Wien, and a subsequent major commission for Vast Ocean at Donaueshingen Music Days with Eötvös launched Dai as a major new voice of the European avant-garde.

Pierre Boulez, with whom he first worked whilst writing Stream State for orchestra (premiered at the Lucerne Festival, and receiving five other performances in 2006 alone) was a major supporter of his work: Dai was one of only two people asked to write a piece for the official Boulez 80th birthday celebrations at Cite de la Musique (Code 80). Subsequent commissions include two pieces for Ensemble Intercontemperain (one celebrating their 30th birthday), a new work for twelve percussionists for the 2006 Lucerne Festival, a major orchestral and electronic work commissioned by IRCAM and Orchestre Philharmonique de Radio France, and a piano concerto for Noriko Ogawa and the Philharmonia Orchestra.

== Prizes ==
- 1st Prize in the Serocki International Composers' Competition (1998)
- The Huddersfield Contemporary Music Festival Young Composers' Award (1998)
- 2nd prize in the Toru Takemitsu Composition Award (2003)
- The Royal Philharmonic Composition Prize (2004)
- Internationaler Wiener Composition Prize (the Claudio Abbado composition award) in 2005
- Hindemith Prize (2007)

== Performances ==
In February 2004, Fifth Station premiered by the London Sinfonietta, was conducted by Martyn Brabbins.

In October 2005, Eötvös conducted the world premiere of Vast Ocean for trombone, orchestra, and live electronics.

In September 2005, Pierre Boulez conducted the world premiere of the Lucerne Festival Academy's commission, Stream State for orchestra.

August 2006, BBC Proms debut, Crushing Twister.

2006, Chicago Symphony Orchestra’s "Music Now" series.

Commissions and performances from Ensemble Modern, Asko Ensemble and Nieuw Ensemble, Hochschule für Musik "Hanns Eisler", Klangforum Wien, OKEANOS, the BBC Symphony Orchestra, Peter Manning Camerata, Spoleto Festival, Ensemble Intercontemporain, International Contemporary Ensemble, BIT20 Ensemble, Vienna Radio Symphony Orchestra, New Japan Philharmonic, Melbourne Symphony Orchestra and the Tokyo Philharmonic Orchestra.

== Works (selection) ==
=== Opera ===
- The Gold-Bug, a children's opera (in English/German) based on Edgar Allan Poe's short story (2018)
- Solaris, an opera based on the novel by Stanisław Lem, with an English-language libretto by Saburo Teshigawara (2015)

=== Orchestra works ===
- Rare Gravity (2013) for orchestra
- Mina (2011/2012) for five soloists and orchestra
- Tocar y Luchar (2010) for orchestra
- Atom (2009) for orchestra
- Ampere (2008) for piano and orchestra
- Vast Ocean (2005) for orchestra and live electronics
- Stream State (2008) for orchestra

=== Ensemble works ===
- Grasping (2011) for string orchestra
- ice (2009/2010) for chamber ensemble
- Double Bass Concerto (2009/2010) for double bass and chamber orchestra
- Phantom Splinter (2009) for oboe, clarinet, bassoon and live-electronic
- Frozen Heat (2008) for 13 musicians

=== Chamber music ===
- Minina (2013) for five instruments
- wind skein (2013) for oboe, clarinet, alto saxophone, bass clarinet and bassoon
- being as one (2013) for soprano, bass clarinet and violoncello (to text by Harry Ross)
- Phantom Splinter Lite (2009) for oboe, clarinet, bassoon and electronic feed
- String quartet no. 2 flare (2009/2010)
