= Erik Honoré =

Norwegian writer, musician, and record producer (born 1966)

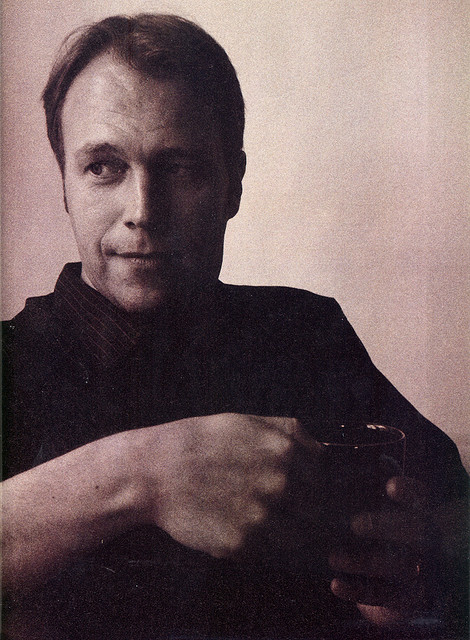
- Honoré in 2007

Background information
- Born: 11 December 1966 (age 59); Kristiansand, Norway
- Genre: Electronica
- Occupations: Writer, musician, record producer and engineer
- Instruments: Electronics, guitar
- Labels: Jazzland Recordings, Grappa Music/Hubro
- Website: Erik Honoré on Myspace

Erik Honoré (born 11 December 1966) is a Norwegian writer, musician, record producer and sound engineer. As a musician, he has collaborated with Jan Bang, David Sylvian, Brian Eno/Peter Schwalm, Jon Hassell, Nils Petter Molvær, Arve Henriksen, Sidsel Endresen, Unni Wilhelmsen, Eivind Aarset, Claudia Scott, Anne Grete Preus, Savoy and produced all the albums from Velvet Belly.

== Career ==
Honoré was born in Kristiansand. He is a graduate sound engineer and producer at the Norwegian Institute for Stage and Studio, a college in Oslo. He is a published novelist and has a long career as a musician, sound engineer and producer. Together with musician colleague Jan Bang he initiated the Punkt-festivalen in 2005, guest curated by Brian Eno in 2012.

Honoré released the album Year of the Bullet (2012), a joint effort with vocalist and spouse Greta Aagre, and in 2014 released his first solo album Heliographs.

== Discography (in selection) ==
=== Solo albums ===
- 2014: Heliographs (Hubro)
- 2017: Unrest (Hubro)

=== Collaborations ===
With Jan Bang

- 2000: Birth Wish (Pan M Records), with contributions from Arve Henriksen and Christian Wallumrød
- 2001: Going Nine Ways From Wednesday (Pan M Records), including with Nils Christian Moe-Repstad and Anne Marie Almedal
- 2010: ... And Poppies From Kandahar (SamadhiSound)
- 2012: Uncommon Deities (Samadhisound), including with David Sylvian
- 2013: Narrative From The Subtropics (Jazzland), including with Sidsel Endresen, Arve Henriksen and Eivind Aarset
- 2013: Victoria (Jazzland), including with Gaute Storaas and Arve Henriksen

With Eivind Aarset

- 2004: Connected (Jazzland)

With Elsewhere

- 2005: Hijacker's Songs (Kampen Records)

With Arve Henriksen

- 2008: Cartography (ECM)
- 2013: Places of Worship (Rune Grammofon)

With David Sylvian

- 2011: Died in the Wool – Manafon Variations

With Greta Aagre

- 2012: Yyear of the Bullet (Jazzland)
- 2017: Tuesday Gods (Jazzland)

== Bibliography ==
- Orakelveggen (2002) novel
- Ubåten på Nørholm (2003) novel
- Kaprersanger (2005) novel
