= Jan Bang =

Norwegian musician and record producer (born 1968)

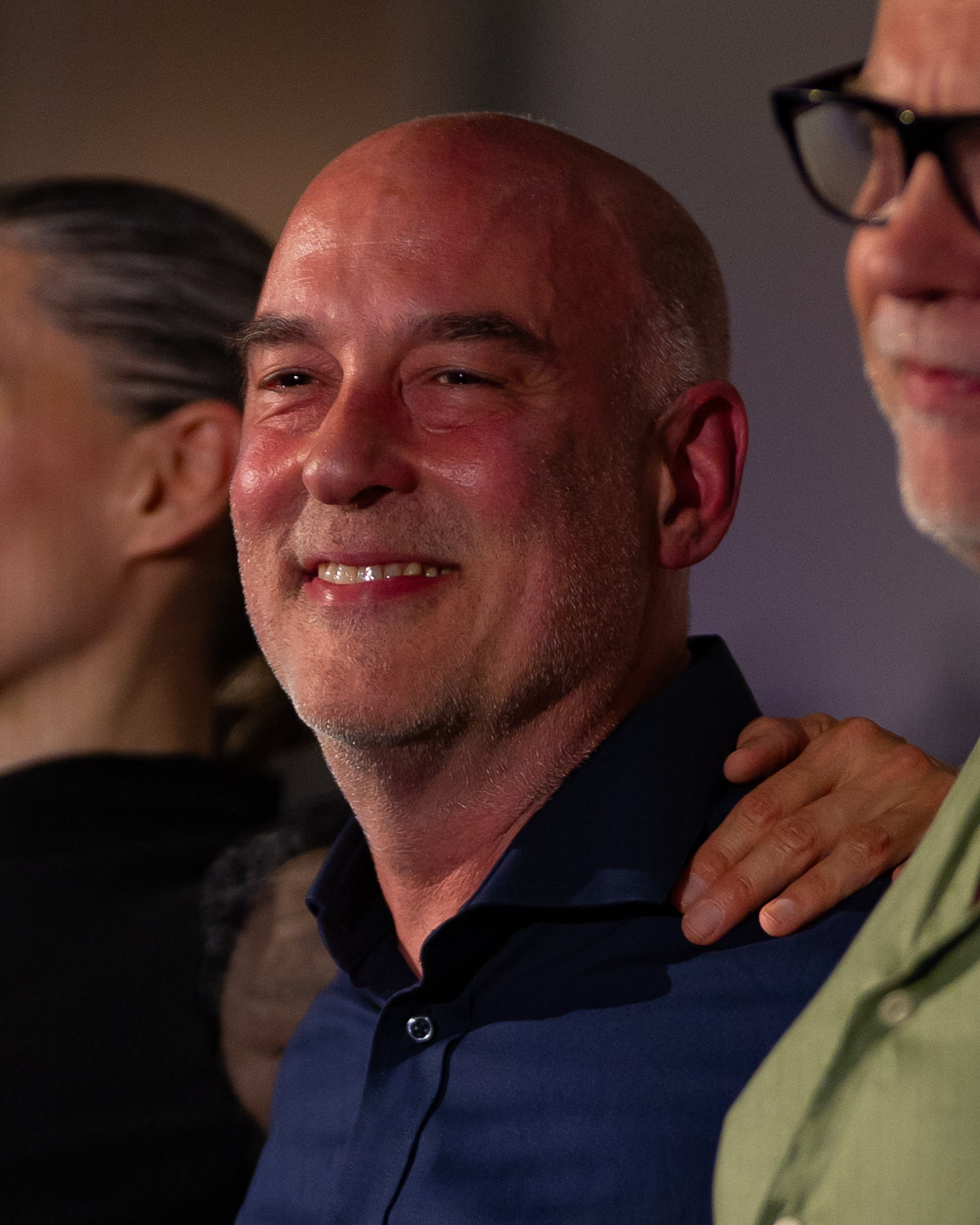
- Bang after a performance at Punktfestivalen 2025

Background information
- Born: 21 August 1968 (age 58); Kristiansand, Norway
- Genres: Jazz, electronica
- Occupations: Musician, producer
- Website: Jan Bang

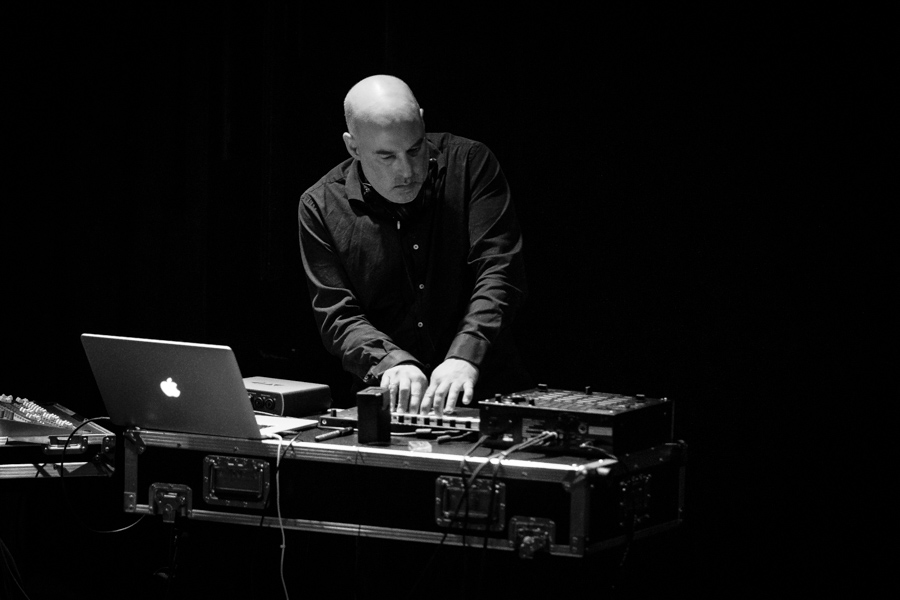
Jan Bang performing at Kongshaugfestivalen 2019

Jan Bang (born 21 August 1968) is a Norwegian musician and record producer who has worked with Morten Harket, Sidsel Endresen, David Sylvian, Nils Petter Molvær, Arild Andersen, Bugge Wesseltoft, Arve Henriksen, and Erik Honoré.

== Career ==
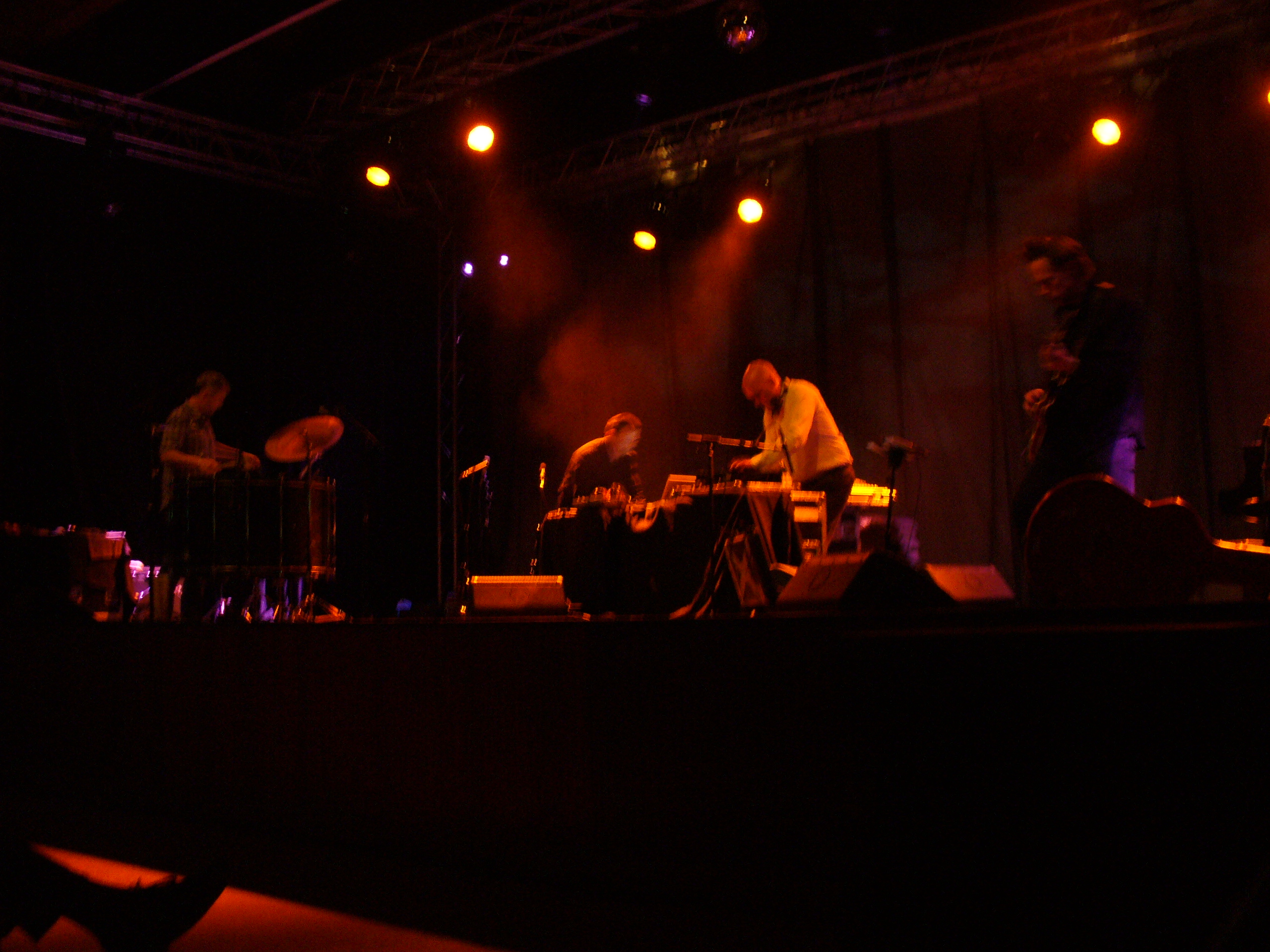
Henriksen/Bang/Westerhus/Zach at the 2014 Vossajazz.

Bang played with Erik Honoré in "Woodlands" (EP, 1988), and they have released two albums (2000, 2001). He has also contributed to albums with Bertine Zetlitz, Bel Canto, and has written music for the film Ballen i øyet (2000). In recent years he has played with Dhafer Youssef, and in 2004 he received the Gammleng Award i klassen studio, and together with musician colleague, Erik Honoré, he initiated "Punktfestivalen" in 2005.

Jan Bang is regarded as an influential Norwegian music producer, often associated with electronic music production. Bang is a musical innovator and bridge-builder who balances progressive thinking with popular appeal. He has sought ways of developing music and audiences, and by creating new meeting places and musical intersections, he has contributed to events such as “Scene Norway.” In addition to hosting “Punkt,” Bang has participated in performances at the festival, including the opening concert, where he has appeared alongside collaborators such as Arve Henriksen.

John Kelman of the All About Jazz magazine, recognized Jason Moran & Jan Bang at the Moldejazz and Arve Henriksen/Jan Bang Double CD Release Show at the Punkt Festival, Kristiansand, Norway, September 2013, as one of his 25 "Best Live Shows of 2013".

Bang has also appeared live at Music Tech Fest Berlin in 2016 with Mercury nominee Eska, Grammy winner Simon Goff on violin and Andy Smith aka Drew Five on bass and additional samples, in a unique one-off improvised performance.

== Honors ==
- Gammleng Award 2004, in the class Studio

== Discography ==
Solo

- 1989: Frozen Feelings (CBS) - featuring Morten Harket and Sidsel Endresen; the title song was the credit soundtrack of the Icelandic movie Foxtrot (1988; director: Jón Tryggvason)
- 1998: Pop Killer (Virgin), nominated for Spellemannprisen 1999 in the class Dance. Featuring contributions from Nils Petter Molvær, Arild Andersen, DJ Strangefruit and Bugge Wesseltoft
- 2010: ...And Poppies from Kandahar (Samadhisound)
- 2013: Narrative from the Subtropics (Jazzland)
- 2013: Victoria (Jazzland), with Erik Honoré, Gaute Storaas, Arve Henriksen

With Erik Honoré

- 2000: Birth Wish (Pan m), with contributions from Arve Henriksen and Christian Wallumrød
- 2001: Going Nine Ways from Wednesday (Pan m), with Nils Christian Moe-Repstad]and Anne Marie Almedal
- 2006: Crime Scenes (Punkt, 2006; Jazzland, 2007)
- 2008: Live Remixes Vol. 1 (Jazzland) - Featuring Sidsel Endresen and Jon Hassell

With Eivind Aarset

- 2004: Connected (Jazzland)
- 2007: Sonic Codex (Jazzland)
- 2012: Dream Logic (ECM)

With Eivind Aarset and Seán Mac Erlaine

- 2018: Music for Empty Ears (Ergodos)

With David Sylvian, Erik Honoré, Arve Henriksen and Sidsel Endresen

- 2012: Uncommon Deities (Samadhisound)

With Erik Honoré, Gaute Storaas and Arve Henriksen

- 2013: Knut Hamsun's "Victoria" - Soundtrack (Jazzland)

With Tigran Hamasyan, Arve Henriksen, and Eivind Aarset

- 2016: Atmosphères (ECM)

With Dark Star Safari (Erik Honoré, Samuel Rohrer, and Eivind Aarset)

- 2019: Dark Star Safari (2019 album) (Arjunamusic Records)

As contributor

- 2002: Camphor David Sylvian (Virgin) - remix of "Mother and Child" featuring Erik Honoré and Nils Petter Molvær
- 2003: Digital Prophecy Dhafer Youssef (Justin Time)
- 2004: Grace Ketil Bjørnstad (Universal)
- 2004: Chiaroscuro Arve Henriksen (Rune Grammofon)
- 2005: er Nils Petter Molvær (Sula)
- 2005: Good Son Vs the Only Daughter David Sylvian (Samadhisound) - remix of "The Only Daughter" featuring Erik Honoré and Nils Petter Molvær
- 2006: Divine Shadows Dhafer Youssef (Jazzland)
- 2006: Northern Lights Mike Mainieri (NYC)
- 2006: An American Compilation Nils Petter Molvær (Thirsty Ear)
- 2008: Cartography Arve Henriksen (ECM)
- 2008: Last Night the Moon Came Dropping Its Clothes in the Street Jon Hassell (ECM)
- 2008: Re-vision Nils Petter Molvær (Sula)
- 2009: Ellivan Arve Henriksen and Elling Vanberg
- 2009: Hamada Nils Petter Molvær (Sula)
- 2010: Sleepwalkers David Sylvian (Samadhisound)
- 2011: Died in the Wool – Manafon Variations David Sylvian (Samadhisound)
- 2012: Release Audun Kleive (POLSelection)
- 2013: Places of Worship Arve Henriksen (Rune Grammofon)
