= David Sylvian =

English musician (born 1958)

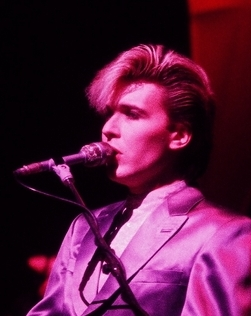
- Sylvian in 1982

Background information
- Born: David Alan Batt; 23 February 1958 (age 68); Beckenham, Kent, England
- Genres: Art pop; avant-rock; new wave; ambient pop
- Occupations: Musician; singer; songwriter; producer
- Instruments: Vocals; guitar; keyboards
- Years active: 1974–present
- Labels: Virgin; Samadhisound
- Formerly of: Japan; Nine Horses; Rain Tree Crow
- Spouse: Ingrid Chavez (m. 1992; div. 2003)
- Website: davidsylvian.com
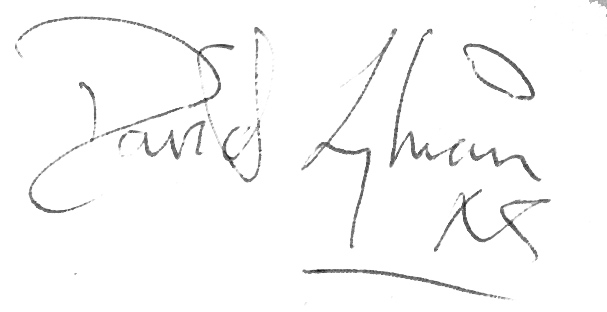
- Sylvian's signature (1978)

David Sylvian (born David Alan Batt; 23 February 1958) is an English musician who came to prominence in the late 1970s as frontman and principal songwriter of the band Japan.

During his time with Japan, Sylvian was known for his baritone voice, idiosyncratic approach to songwriting, and his distinctive androgynous appearance. The band's androgynous look and increasingly electronic sound made them an important influence on the UK's early-1980s new wave scene.

Following Japan's break-up, Sylvian embarked on a solo career with his debut album Brilliant Trees (1984). His solo work has been described by AllMusic as "far-ranging and esoteric", and has included collaborations with artists such as Ryuichi Sakamoto, Robert Fripp, Holger Czukay, Jon Hassell, Bill Nelson and Fennesz.

While Sylvian's recordings of the 1980s and 1990s were a mixture of art rock, pop, jazz fusion, and avant-garde experimentalism mixed with ambient, his more recent compositions have drawn increasingly on musical minimalism and free improvisation.

== Biography ==
=== Early years ===
David Sylvian was born David Alan Batt in Beckenham, Kent, England. He grew up in nearby Lewisham, South London, in a working-class home. His father Bernard was a plasterer by trade, his mother Sheila a housewife. He had an older sister and a younger brother, Steve. Sylvian later said he never enjoyed his childhood, mainly because of the environment of mid-1960s Lewisham. As an escape and emotional release from his discomfort he found an interest in music via his sister, who brought Motown and soul records to the home. He attended Catford Boys School where he became a friend of Anthony Michaelides, later known as Mick Karn. When David received an acoustic guitar and his brother a drum kit as Christmas presents from their father, the three boys began to play music together.

=== 1970s–early 1980s: Japan ===
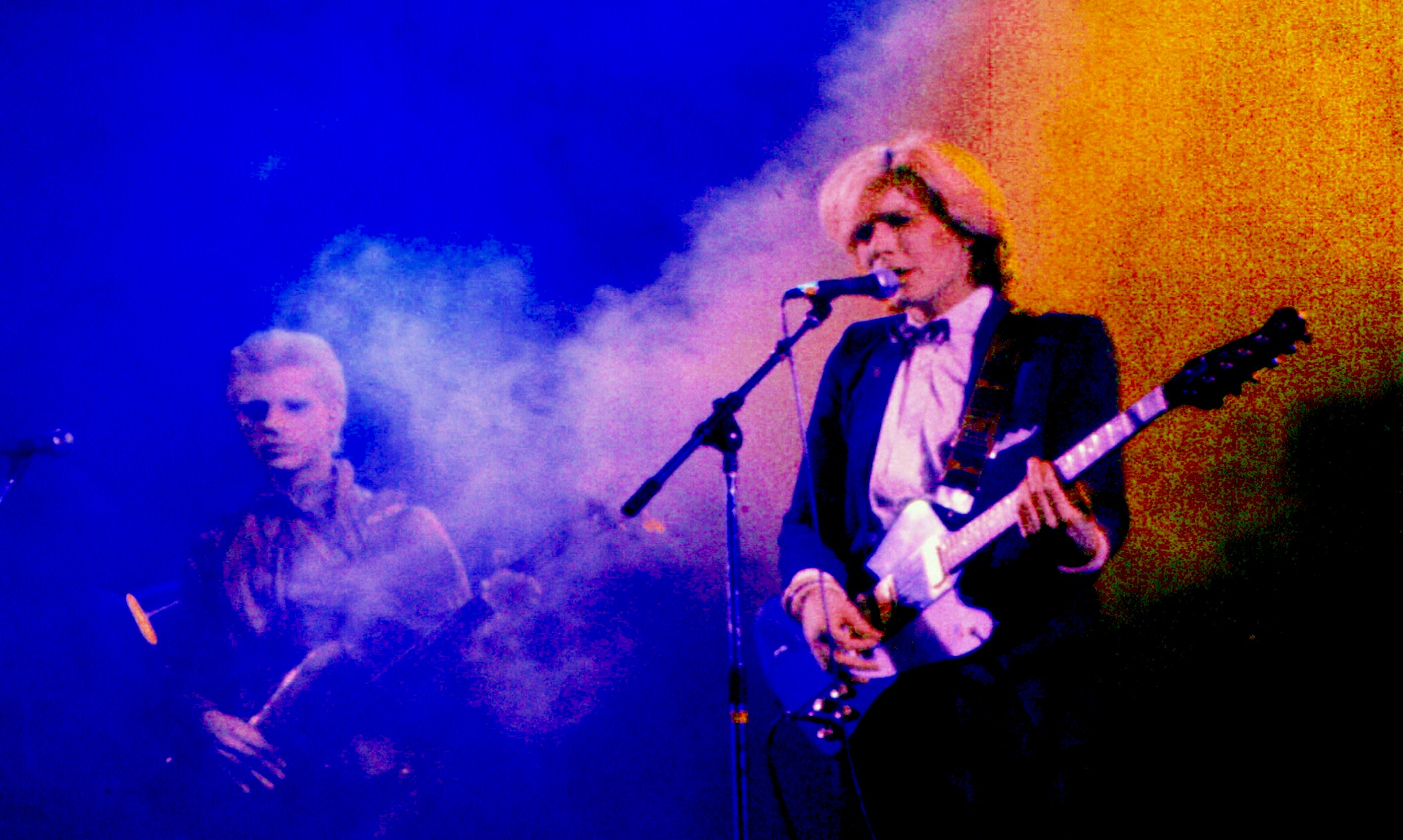
Japan in Toronto, 24 November 1979

The band Japan, whose other members included Mick Karn on bass, guitarist Rob Dean, keyboardist Richard Barbieri and Sylvian's brother Steve as drummer (under the name Steve Jansen), began as a group of friends. As youngsters they played music as a means of escape, playing Sylvian's two-chord numbers – sometimes with Karn as the frontman, sometimes with Sylvian at the fore. The band were managed by Simon Napier-Bell.

They christened themselves Japan in 1974, signed a recording contract with Hansa Records, and became an alternative glam rock outfit in the mould of David Bowie, T. Rex, and the New York Dolls. A fan of the New York Dolls, Sylvian adopted his stage name from Sylvain Sylvain, while his brother took Jansen from David Johansen. Over a period of a few years, their music became more sophisticated, drawing initially on the art rock stylings of Roxy Music. Their visual image also evolved and, although they had worn make-up since their creation in the mid-1970s, the band was tagged with the New Romantic label in the early 1980s. The band themselves disputed any connection with the New Romantic movement, and Sylvian stated: "I don't like to be associated with them. The attitudes are so very different." Of Japan's fashion sense, Sylvian said: "For them [New Romantics], fancy dress is a costume. But ours is a way of life. We look and dress this way every day." In an October 1981 interview, at the pinnacle of the New Romantic movement in mainstream pop music, Sylvian commented: "There's a period going past at the moment that may make us look as though we're in fashion."

Japan released five studio albums between March 1978 and November 1981. In 1980, the band signed with Virgin Records, where Sylvian remained as a recording artist for the next twenty years. The band suffered from personal and creative clashes, particularly between Sylvian and Karn, with tensions springing from Sylvian's relationship with Yuka Fujii, a photographer, artist, and designer, and Karn's former girlfriend. Fujii quickly became an influential figure in Sylvian's life. She was the first person to introduce Sylvian seriously to jazz, which in turn inspired him to follow musical avenues not otherwise open to him. She also encouraged Sylvian to incorporate spiritual discipline into his daily routine. Throughout his solo career, Fujii maintained a large role in the design of artwork for his albums. Japan played their final concerts in December 1982 before dissolving, their ultimate show taking place in Nagoya on 16 December.

=== 1980s–1990s: Solo career ===
In 1982, Sylvian released his first solo record, a double A-side single and the result of a collaborative effort with Ryuichi Sakamoto, entitled "Bamboo Houses/Bamboo Music". Sakamoto's first contribution to Sylvian's work, though, had been as co-writer of "Taking Islands in Africa" on the Japan album Gentlemen Take Polaroids (1980). Sylvian also worked with Sakamoto on the UK Top 20 song "Forbidden Colours" for the 1983 Nagisa Oshima film Merry Christmas, Mr. Lawrence.

Sylvian's debut solo album, Brilliant Trees, released in June 1984, was a critical and commercial success. The album included contributions from Sakamoto, Kenny Wheeler, Jon Hassell, Holger Czukay, Ronny Drayton, Danny Thompson, and from Sylvian's former bandmates Steve Jansen and Richard Barbieri. The lead single became the UK Top 20 single "Red Guitar", with a promo video directed by Anton Corbijn.

Between 19 and 30 June 1984, Hamiltons Gallery in London held an exhibition, Perspectives, of Polaroid photographs by Sylvian. The major exhibition of his work coincided with the release of his book Perspectives – Polaroids 82–84, documenting these pictures. There were also exhibitions in Tokyo and Turin.

In 1985, Sylvian released an instrumental EP Words with the Shaman, in collaboration with Jansen, Hassell, and Czukay. The recording was re-released the same year on a compilation album, Alchemy: An Index of Possibilities, with the addition of "Steel Cathedrals", a piece recorded with Sakamoto, Czukay, Jansen, Wheeler, Robert Fripp and Masami Tsuchiya. "Steel Cathedrals" was the soundtrack to a 20-minute video. The short film was shot in two days during November 1984 in and around the outskirts of Tokyo, Japan. A large part of the music was completed during that same month and recorded over a period of three days. Sylvian later updated the material in London in an attempt to elaborate on the theme started earlier in Japan, and to further improve the quality of the soundtrack. He would identify "Steel Cathedrals" as his first experience with improvisations.

Sylvian's demo "Sylvian's Machine" became Propaganda's single "p:Machinery", released in 1985. Singer Claudia Brücken stated that Sylvian helped them with his writing and musical skills on "p:Machinery", pretty much influencing the final structure and atmosphere of the piece.

His next release was the two-record set Gone to Earth, which featured one record of atmospheric vocal tracks and a second record consisting of ambient instrumentals. The album contained significant contributions from noted guitarists Bill Nelson (formerly of Be-Bop Deluxe) and Robert Fripp (of King Crimson), and a rhythm section comprising Steve Jansen on drums and Ian Maidman of Penguin Cafe Orchestra on bass. Released on 13 September 1986, the album reached Number 24 on the UK Album chart.

Composition of new material in early 1987 was followed by recording sessions at Chateau Miraval in the south of France, and by May 1987 Secrets of the Beehive was completed, finally being released in October 1987.

Secrets of the Beehive made greater use of acoustic instruments and was musically oriented towards sombre, emotive ballads laced with string arrangements by Ryuichi Sakamoto and Brian Gascoigne. It reached number 37 in the UK charts and remained for two weeks.

The album was followed by his first live outing as a solo artist, in an 80-day world tour called "In Praise of Shamans", from March to June 1988. Alongside Sylvian were Jansen, Barbieri, guitars and keyboards from Robbie Aceto, brass and sax from Mark Isham, bass from Ian Maidman and lead guitar from David Torn. There were no songs from Sylvian's former band Japan in the setlist.

"Beehive was the summation of all the solo material that went before it", Sylvian said. "I knew when I had finished I wouldn't be returning to quite the same waters again. The period following on from...Beehive was the hardest of my life. A descent into hell."

Following Secrets of the Beehive, it would be 1999 before he released his next solo offering, as he descended into a prolonged period of clinical depression. The crisis began to gather momentum prior to undertaking a 1988 tour. That took its toll and Sylvian found himself in a frighteningly unstable state, which he would experience in varying degrees of intensity over the next 3 or 4 years. Sylvian was unable to work in isolation, but at the same time felt the need to throw himself into collaborative project after collaborative project in a hope of recognising via his response something of what he was dealing with. At these times, manifestations of the crisis were less apparent.

Ultimately he left behind his Christian roots and via explorations of widely varied philosophies ranging from the writings of Gurdjieff to Gnosticism to Zen Buddhism, all of which left its traces in his lyrics and music, he settled on Buddhism as his primary spiritual path.

Never one to conform to commercial expectations, Sylvian then collaborated with Holger Czukay. Sylvian was at Can's studio in Cologne in 1986 to do a vocal for Czukay's record, but instead they started to improvise, and recorded the first piece in three nights. Their collaborative album, Plight and Premonition, was released in March 1988 while Sylvian was still on tour. Flux and Mutability was released the following year, and it also included contributions from Can members Jaki Liebezeit and Michael Karoli. Flux and Mutability was less spontaneous in its conception than Plight and Premonition. For Flux, Sylvian travelled to Cologne for a two-week creative Christmas break at the end of 1988, so this was planned unlike the unexpected genesis of Plight.

Virgin decided to close out the 1980s with the release of Weatherbox, an elaborate boxed-set compilation designed by Russell Mills, consisting of Sylvian's four previous solo albums. Concurrent with Weatherbox, Sylvian released the non-album single "Pop Song".

In 1990, Sylvian collaborated with artists Russell Mills and Ian Walton on the elaborate multi-media installation using sculpture, sound, and light titled Ember Glance – The Permanence of Memory. The exhibition was staged in September and October 1990 at the temporary museum 'Space FGO-Soko' on Tokyo Bay, Shinagawa, Tokyo.

=== 1991–1994: Rain Tree Crow and Robert Fripp ===
The members of Japan came together once more, as Rain Tree Crow, after a nine-year hiatus. The majority of the material was written as a result of group improvisations, with no rehearsals. This approach to writing was an integral element to the whole project, and in many ways it was the reason for the collaboration. The Rain Tree Crow project had initially been conceived as a long term album deal, with Sylvian's insistence that the name Japan would not be used in conjunction with its promotion. But the recording went over budget and Virgin refused to put in any more money unless the name Japan could be used. The resulting deadlock was resolved by Sylvian's decision to finance the mixing of the album personally. However, the group was no longer interested in re-forming, and the album was released as a one-off.

Sylvian first thought of collaborating with guitarist Robert Fripp in 1986, but, characteristically, it took them a while to manage it. They only began to improvise and write as a duo at the end of 1991. That same year, Fripp had approached Sylvian to front a possible new version of the band King Crimson, but Sylvian declined.

Fripp had encouraged Sylvian to return to the live-stage, a place he admitted he did not find comfortable ('Sylvian didn't like being the centre of attention'). The pair's concerts were, like Sylvian's work in the studio, largely improvised. On the few dates they undertook in Japan and Italy in 1992, they had no idea when they walked out into the lights what might happen, even what time they would finish their night's work. One evening Sylvian felt moved to play an acoustic version of "Ghosts", Japan's biggest hit. It was the first time he had played it since 1983; Sylvian stated 'It was quite nice because it somehow satisfied the expectation of the audience that I should play something from my songbook'. Sylvian has commented that his improvised and 'unstable' trio work with Fripp and Trey Gunn in Europe was amongst the first times that he enjoyed performing live, and said that 'Up until that point it was all about reproducing the songs and presenting them in such-and-such a way. But this was different, and it began to interest me, and it opened up my eyes to the pleasures of performing'.

Fripp and Sylvian then recorded the album The First Day and released the album in July 1993.

To capitalise on the album's success, they went back out on the road on their "The Road to Graceland Tour" which began in Tokyo on 14 October 1993. The additional musicians on stage with Sylvian, Fripp and Gunn were Michael Brook and Pat Mastelotto. A live recording, titled Damage, released in 1994, was culled from the final shows of the tour.

Sylvian and Fripp's final collaboration was the installation Redemption – Approaching Silence. The exhibition was held at the P3 Art and Environment centre in Shinjuku, Tokyo, and ran from 30 August to 18 September 1994. The accompanying music was composed by Sylvian, with text written and recited by Fripp.

=== 1995–1999: Slow Fire Tour and Dead Bees on a Cake ===
At the end of August 1995, Sylvian undertook a one-man solo tour which he called 'Slow Fire – A Personal Retrospective', with dates in Italy, Germany, Japan, Belgium, The Netherlands, England, Canada and North America. The last show on the tour was played in New York City at The Town Hall 11 November 1995. The show featured songs drawn from throughout Sylvian's career, singing and playing piano and guitar.

In 1999, Sylvian released Dead Bees on a Cake, his first solo album proper since Secrets of the Beehive 12 years earlier. Once the album was mixed at Dave Kents Napa Studio, the project was finished, from the beginning to end a process that extended from 1993 to the late summer of 1998, Dead Bees on a Cake eventually being released in March 1999.

The album gathered together the most eclectic influences of all his recordings, ranging from soul music to jazz fusion to blues to Eastern-inflected spiritual chants, and most of the songs' lyrics reflected the now 41-year-old Sylvian's inner peace resulting from his marriage, family, and beliefs. Guest musicians included long-time friend Ryuichi Sakamoto, classically trained tabla player Talvin Singh, avant-garde guitarist Marc Ribot, jazz trumpeter Kenny Wheeler, and contemporary jazz guitarist Bill Frisell. In 2010, Sylvian said, "Since the early '80s I've been interested in deconstructing the familiar forms of popular song, in retaining the structure but removing the pillars of support. My work continually returns to this question: how much of the framework can you remove while still being able to identify what is, after all, a familiar form?"

=== 2000–2009: Samadhi Sound ===
Following Dead Bees, Sylvian released two compilation albums on Virgin Records: a two-disc retrospective, Everything and Nothing (2000), and an instrumental collection, Camphor (2002). Both albums contained previously released material, remixes and several new or previously unreleased tracks which Sylvian finished especially for the projects. Combined, the retrospective releases effectively marked a full stop to Sylvian's association with Virgin, the split coming at the beginning of 2001.

Also in 2001, the track "Linoleum" was released on Tweaker's album The Attraction to All Things Uncertain. Sylvian co-wrote and sang on the collaboration.

Sakamoto wanted some English lyrics for his project Zero Landmine, and asked Sylvian to write a simple, tender lyric that could be sung by children. Included on the release were various versions of the song, one being a Sylvian vocal with just the backing of Sakamoto's piano.

In September 2001 Sylvian embarked on the 'Everything and Nothing Tour', which kicked off in Osaka on 17 September, and wound its way through Europe until 27 October that year. The tour continued into 2002, revisiting Japan and taking concerts to the US and Canada. Sylvian was accompanied on stage by Jansen, keyboard player Matt Cooper, guitarist Timothy Young and bassist Keith Lowe.

After Sylvian left Virgin Records he launched his own independent label, Samadhi Sound. He released the album Blemish, which included contributions from Christian Fennesz and Derek Bailey. Sylvian used a different approach with this album, starting each day in the studio with a very simple improvisation on guitar. Once recorded, he would listen back and use cues from the improv—the dynamic and so on—to dictate the structure of the piece. He wrote lyrics and melody on the spot, and would follow that up with the vocal recording.

Sylvian recorded the EP World Citizen with Sakamoto, which was released in Japan in October 2003, and in Europe in April 2004. Sylvian also collaborated with Chris Vrenna's Tweaker again, on the track "Pure Genius", which was released on the album 2 a.m. Wakeup Call.

In the period 23 September 2003 to 27 April 2004 Sylvian toured in Europe and in Japan, on the "Fire in the Forest Tour" featuring Steve Jansen, with visuals and video images by Masakatsu Takagi.

In 2004, Sylvian was commissioned by Madhouse to compose the ending theme for the anime adaptation of Naoki Urasawa's Monster, titled "For the Love of Life", alongside Japanese composer Kuniaki Haishima. Sylvian said that he was "attracted to the Monster material by the moral dilemma faced by its central character."

Simultaneously Sylvian had started a project with Jansen and Berndt Friedman called Nine Horses. They released the album Snow Borne Sorrow in October 2005, and mini-album Money for All in January 2007.

Sylvian took to the road again on 17 September to 30 October 2007 for 'The World Is Everything' tour, which included concerts in Europe, Hong Kong and Japan, featuring Steve Jansen, Keith Lowe, and Takuma Watanabe. A fusion of styles, including jazz and electronica, the tour enabled Sylvian to perform music from the Nine Horses project, as well as various selections from his back catalogue. Jansen also released his solo album Slope in 2007, with two tracks co-written by Sylvian: "Ballad of a Dead Man" (a duet with singer Joan Wasser), and "Playground Martyrs".

A solo album entitled Manafon was released on 14 September 2009 in two editions – a regular CD/digipak edition and a twin boxset deluxe edition with two books that include the CD and a DVD featuring the film 'Amplified Gesture'. Manafon featured contributions from leading figures in electroacoustic improvisation, such as saxophonist Evan Parker, multi-instrumentalist Otomo Yoshihide, laptop and guitarist Christian Fennesz, Polwechsel's double bassist Werner Dafeldecker and cellist Michael Moser, sinewaves specialist Sachiko M and AMM alumni guitarist Keith Rowe, percussionist Eddie Prévost and pianist John Tilbury. In 2010, talking about Manafon, Sylvian said:

"What happened with Manafon was that the work abandoned me. As I was writing and developing the material, the spirit holding all these disparate elements together just left me. I sat stunned for a moment and then realised: It's over; this is as far as it goes…In a sense, I'd been steadily working my way toward Manafon since I was a young man listening to Stockhausen and dabbling in deconstructing the pop song. Having said that, I don't think we only develop as artists practising in our chosen fields. For me, that meant an exploration of intuitive states via meditation and other related disciplines which, the more I witnessed free-improv players at work, appeared to be crucially important to enable a being there in the moment, a sustained alertness and receptivity."

=== 2010 to present ===
In 2010, Sylvian released Sleepwalkers, a compilation album of his collaborative works with musicians over the previous 10 years, including songs with Ryuichi Sakamoto, Tweaker, Nine Horses, Steve Jansen, Christian Fennesz and Arve Henriksen. Also included were a few new songs, such as "Sleepwalkers" which was co-written with drummer Martin Brandlmayr of Radian and Polwechsel.

In 2011, the double album Died in the Wool was released as variations on the 2009 release Manafon with the addition of six new pieces, including collaborations with composer Dai Fujikura, producers Jan Bang and Erik Honoré, and a roster of contemporary musicians and improvisers. For the first time, a stereo mix of the audio installation "When We Return You Won't Recognise Us" was available on CD, pairing a group of improvisers – John Butcher, Arve Henriksen, Günter Müller, Toshimaru Nakamura, and Eddie Prévost – with a string sextet directed by Fujikura.

Also in 2011, Sylvian acted as the artist in residence at the Punkt Festival in Norway. In addition to curating the events of the festival, Sylvian performed both compositions from the Holger Czukay-collaborated album Plight & Premonition, backed by John Tilbury, Jan Bang, Phillip Jeck, Eivind Aarset, Erik Honoré, and Arve Henriksen. The positive reception led to the decision to tour throughout Europe in 2012. "The Implausible Beauty" tour was due to feature a line-up of musicians including Jan Bang, guitarist Eivind Aarset, pianist Sebastian Lexer, cellist Hildur Gudnadottir and trumpeter Gunnar Halle, but was cancelled in late January 2012 due to a severe back injury Sylvian had sustained.

In 2013, Sylvian released the single "Do You Know Me Now?", a one-time vinyl pressing released with a re-mastered version of "Where's Your Gravity?" on the B-side.

In 2014, Sylvian released There's a Light That Enters Houses with No Other House in Sight, a long-form composition with contributions from Christian Fennesz and John Tilbury and featuring spoken word by American Pulitzer Prize winning poet Franz Wright of excerpts from Wright's own Kindertotenwald.

In 2015, Sylvian released Playing The Schoolhouse with Confront Recordings in two limited editions. The release, a 15-minute long composition, was composed based on improvisations by Sylvian and Jan Bang – with contributions by Otomo Yoshihide and Toshimaru Nakamura – and was recorded in a schoolhouse in Norway. Sylvian collaborated again with Confront Recordings in 2017, with Mark Wastell (who runs Confront Recordings) and Rhodri Davies for the first release of the Confront Core Series, There Is No Love. The long-form composition was created with previously recorded materials, and features text from Bernard-Marie Koltès's In the Solitude of Cotton Fields.

In July 2018, Sylvian said:

I'm not currently thinking about a future in the arts. To quote Sarah Kendzior from her book The View From Flyover Country, "In an article for Slate, Jessica Olien debunks the myth that originality and inventiveness are valued in U.S. society: 'This is the thing about creativity that is rarely acknowledged: Most people don't actually like it.'"

In July 2021, Grönland Records announced 'ERR', a photographic essay by Sylvian, with text by Shinya Fujiwara and an untitled original poem by Daisy Lafarge.

Sylvian contributed to the album To the Moon and Back (2022), a tribute to Ryuichi Sakamoto recorded by various artists who reworked his material. In January 2023, Sylvian announced that a compilation of his Samadhisound works would be released later in 2023 as a boxset entitled Do You Know Me Now? on the Grönland Records label.

French actress Isabelle Adjani recorded a duet with David Sylvian, back in 2010, and it was finally included on her album with duets, Adjani Bande Originale, released on 10 November 2023. Sylvian sang on the track "Il Manque Un Mot".

== Personal life ==
In 1992, while working on the Sakamoto single "Heartbeat", Sylvian met Ingrid Chavez, a singer and actress who had been a member of Prince's inner circle. That same year, the couple married and moved to Minneapolis. The couple have two daughters, Ameera-Daya (born 1993) and Isobel Ananda (born 1997). The family moved from Minneapolis, to a house outside of Sonoma, California, in 1997. They moved again, setting up a new home and studio in a property in Temple, New Hampshire, but Sylvian and Chavez were divorced in 2003.

As of 2005, Sylvian lived in the woods of southern New Hampshire in the former site of an ashram, implementing most of his work in a barn containing his home recording studio.

As of 2025, Sylvian was in a relationship with the Colombian musician Lucrecia Dalt.

== Discography ==
=== Japan ===
- Adolescent Sex (1978)
- Obscure Alternatives (1978)
- Quiet Life (1979)
- Gentlemen Take Polaroids (1980)
- Tin Drum (1981)
- Oil on Canvas (1983)

==== Rain Tree Crow ====
- Rain Tree Crow (1991) same line-up as Japan

=== Solo ===
- Brilliant Trees (1984)
- Alchemy: An Index of Possibilities (1985)
- Gone to Earth (1986)
- Secrets of the Beehive (1987)
- with Holger Czukay – Plight and Premonition (1988)
- with Holger Czukay – Flux and Mutability (1989)
- with Robert Fripp – The First Day (1993)
- with Robert Fripp – Darshan (The Road to Graceland) (1993)
- with Robert Fripp – Damage: Live (1994)
- Dead Bees on a Cake (1999)
- Blemish (2003)
- Nine Horses – Snow Borne Sorrow (2005)
- Nine Horses – Money for All (2007)
- When Loud Weather Buffeted Naoshima (2007)
- Manafon (2009)
- There's a Light That Enters Houses with No Other House in Sight (2014)
- with Melaine Dalibert – Vermilion Hours (2025)
- The Distance Between the Killer and the Killing (2027)
