= The Good Son vs. The Only Daughter =

The Good Son vs. The Only Daughter (The Blemish Remixes)

Remix album by David Sylvian
- Released: 7 February 2005
- Genre: Alternative rock, ambient
- Length: 48:50
- Label: Samadhisound
- Producer: David Sylvian

David Sylvian chronology
Blemish (2003)	The Good Son vs. The Only Daughter (The Blemish Remixes) (2005)	Snow Borne Sorrow (2005)

Professional ratings
Review scores
Source	Rating
AllMusic	
The Encyclopedia of Popular Music	3/5 stars

The Good Son vs. The Only Daughter (The Blemish Remixes) is a remix album by David Sylvian featuring new versions of tracks from his previous album Blemish. Despite the title, not all the pieces have been remixed; some songs have been re-recorded with new musicians.

== Background ==
In an interview with Pitchfork in 2005, Sylvian explained he wished to give the album a new dimension through the variety of sounds that the remixes offered: "It’s sort of stretched between the States, Europe, and Japan… what we’re listening to, what we’re watching, what we’re reading– it can have very little to do with one’s immediate cultural environment."

== Track listing ==
All tracks composed by David Sylvian unless otherwise noted

1. "The Only Daughter" (remixed by Ryoji Ikeda) – 5:49
2. "Blemish" (Sylvian, Chisholm) (remixed by Burnt Friedman) – 4:50
3. "The Heart Knows Better" (remixed by Sweet Billy Pilgrim) – 5:29
4. "A Fire in the Forest" (remixed by Readymade FC) – 5:05
5. "The Good Son" (remixed by Yoshihiro Hanno) – 4:33
6. "Late Night Shopping" (Sylvian, Chisholm) (remixed by Burnt Friedman) – 2:51
7. "How Little We Need to be Happy" (remixed by Tatsuhiko Asano) – 4:35
8. "The Only Daughter" (remixed by Jan Bang and Erik Honoré) – 5:28
9. "Blemish" (remixed by Akira Rabelais) – 10:10

== Personnel ==
- David Sylvian – composer, vocals, art director
- Ryoji Ikeda – piano (1)
- Jean-Paul Zanutel – cello (1)
- Fabienne Dussenwart – flute (1)
- Pascal Moreau – French horn (1)
- Dominica Eyckmans – viola (1)
- Wilbert Aerts – violin (1)
- Hayden Chisholm – clarinet (2, 6)
- Alphonse Elsenburg – clarinet (3)
- Nils Petter Molvær – trumpet (8)

== Additional personnel ==
- Chris Bigg – design
- Atsushi Fukui – cover artwork
- Yuka Fujii – artist Liaison
