= Nine Horses =

Rock band (2005–2007)

- Genres: Alternative rock, jazz-rock
- Years active: 2005-2007
- Labels: Samadhi Sound
- Members: David Sylvian; Burnt Friedman; Steve Jansen

Nine Horses was a musical collaboration between singer/instrumentalist David Sylvian, his brother and drummer Steve Jansen, and electronic composer/remixer Burnt Friedman.

They released the album Snow Borne Sorrow in October 2005, which featured several guest contributors including Norwegian trumpeter Arve Henriksen, Swedish vocalist Stina Nordenstam, and Ryuichi Sakamoto on piano.

January 2007 (December 2006 in Japan) saw the release of the Money for All EP, which featured three new tracks, "Money for All", "Get the Hell Out" and "Birds Sing for Their Lives", alongside remixes and interpretations by Friedman of various tracks from Snow Borne Sorrow.

== Background ==
The album Snow Borne Sorrow, and thus Nine Horses, was the result of the combining of two projects in 2005: collaborations between David Sylvian and Steve Jansen, and between Sylvian and the German composer/programmer Burnt Friedman (initially featuring Jaki Liebezeit).

The Jansen/Sylvian collaboration began much earlier, in late 2002. Sylvian said that "the writing took off in all kinds of directions whilst we searched for common ground, passions, interests". However, progress was slow and in around February or March 2003, Sylvian took time out from the project for six weeks in order to write and record his solo album Blemish. In October 2003, whilst on tour in Europe promoting Blemish, Sylvian and Jansen met Burnt Friedman for the first time in Cologne. Sylvian had listened to and enjoyed Friedman's work and has said that "when the chemistry between Steve and I lacked fireworks in the studio I often thought a third element would be beneficial to the proceedings and oddly enough it was Burnt who’d come to mind during those times. That evening we spoke of working together at some point in the future".

The first collaboration with Friedman saw him remix two tracks, "Blemish" and "Late Night Shopping" for Sylvian's remix album, The Good Son vs. The Only Daughter. Eventually the work with each of Jansen and Friedman coalesced to become a single project and a three-partner group was formed as Nine Horses. The song "A History of Holes" is one of the first to originate from the collaboration between Sylvian and Friedman, with Friedman writing the music and Sylvian the lyrics. In the spring of 2004, Sylvian finished five vocal recordings as a contribution to an album by Friedman featuring Jaki Liebezeit. However, after later hearing Friedman's mixes of the songs, Sylvian was "a little taken aback" as his vocals were at the forefront of these songs which had been "stripped back to their barest bones". He asked Friedman for the files so that he could try reworking them in order to be "built up" and have "greater dynamics, group interaction". Sylvian "made guitar, keyboard, and vocal additions of [his] own" and got Jansen to "replace Jaki's patterns with something else" as well as add percussion. Sylvian also added "male and female backing vocals to a number of the tracks" and "both Steve and Burnt were quick to give approval" to what Sylvian had done. During all of the Nine Horses recording Burnt Friedman was never present with Sylvian and Jansen, his parts were done by exchanging files virtually.

Jansen has since said that Snow Borne Sorrow "took a long time to complete and was later followed by lengthy rehearsals for a tour to promote David’s solo career, again". He also said that "the option not to tour as an unknown Nine Horses was a business decision" and that Nine Horses was "inevitably being run into a dead end". After Nine Horses, Jansen "focused on a solo career and distanced myself from the Samadhi Sound label", but said that he was "glad we got to make that album, as well as an EP, when we did".

== Discography ==
=== Albums ===
Year	Title	Details	Peak chart positions	
Year	Title	Details	UK	IT
2005	Snow Borne Sorrow	Released: 17 October 2005; Label: Samadhi Sound	137	23
2007	Money for All	Released: 22 January 2007; Label: Samadhi Sound; Mini-album / EP	—	—
"—" denotes releases that did not chart or were not released in that territory.

=== Singles ===
- "Wonderful World" (Samadhi Sound, 2006)
