= Snow Borne Sorrow =

Studio album by Nine Horses
- Released: 17 October 2005
- Recorded: 2001–2005; USA and Cologne – Miloco 3, Eden Studios, London; Sphere Studios, London; 1k Recording Studio, Philadelphia; UTS Sound Studio, University of Technology, Sydney; First Floor Rec., Copenhagen
- Genre: Alternative rock, jazz-rock
- Length: 58:49
- Label: Samadhi Sound
- Producer: David Sylvian

David Sylvian chronology
The Good Son vs. The Only Daughter (The Blemish Remixes) (2005)	Snow Borne Sorrow (2005)	Money for All (2007)

Professional ratings
Review scores
Source	Rating
Pitchfork	7.7/10

Snow Borne Sorrow is an album by Nine Horses, released in October 2005. Nine Horses is a collaboration between David Sylvian, Steve Jansen and Burnt Friedman.

Other contributors include Norwegian trumpeter and Supersilent member Arve Henriksen, Swedish vocalist Stina Nordenstam, and Ryuichi Sakamoto on piano.

== Background ==
Sylvian said 2005 about the album:

"This project was initiated prior to the recording of the Blemish album. I started writing with Steve (Jansen) back in 2002 so the roots of the project go back farther than the creative U-turn taken with Blemish. I did find it difficult to return to this material after completing Blemish and for a while I thought the work might be abandoned. Whilst touring Blemish I was introduced to Burnt Friedman whose music I’d been enjoying in recent months."

"We talked of working together and a few months later I received a CD-R containing 8 or 9 demos. I worked on these as time allowed eventually completing 5 pieces. Burnt Friedman took these tracks and completed them as part of an album he’d been working on with Jaki Leibezeit. When I heard the results I felt the material should be developed further. I asked Burnt Friedman if he’d allow me to work with the sound files and see where I might take the arrangements given time. He graciously agreed. As I worked on this material, radically editing the sound files, replacing Jaki’s drum patterns with Steve’s, adding keyboard, guitar, and vocal elements to the arrangements I thought of pulling together the two individual projects (the one I’d started with Steve, the other with Burnt) into one cohesive whole. That remained the greater challenge, finding and maintaining that cohesion."

"I’ve always made it clear that it’s the compositions themselves that cry out for certain voices. When I completed the lyric for 'Wonderful World' I heard Stina’s voice singing the answer vocal. Likewise, when we completed 'Atom and Cell' and 'Darkest Birds' I knew we had to have Arve Henriksen as soloist on these pieces. Once the decision is made it’s a matter of contacting and communicating with those you wish to get involved. It’s all very simple really. I should add that Burnt had already brought a lot of musicians into the mix on the original demos."

The first version of the track "The Librarian" was released 6 months earlier on the Twelve-inch single "Out in the Sticks" by Burnt Friedman and Jaki Liebezeit.

== Track listing ==
Writer's credits also indicate the track's arrangers and producers (except for track 7, omid Motzer). All lyrics are written by David Sylvian.

1. "Wonderful World" (Sylvian, Jansen) – 6:02
2. "Darkest Birds" (Sylvian, Jansen) – 5:03
3. "The Banality of Evil" (Friedman, Sylvian) – 7:59
4. "Atom and Cell" (Sylvian, Jansen) – 7:06
5. "A History of Holes" (Friedman, Sylvian) – 8:02
6. "Snow Borne Sorrow" (Jansen, Sylvian) – 6:23
7. "The Day the Earth Stole Heaven" (Friedman, Motzer, Sylvian) – 3:19
8. "Serotonin" (Friedman, Sylvian) – 5:54
9. "The Librarian" (Friedman, Sylvian) – 9:01

== Personnel ==
- David Sylvian – vocals, keyboards (tracks 1–5, 7), guitar (1–3, 8)
- Steve Jansen – drums (1, 2, 4, 5, 7, 9), sample programming (1, 2, 4, 6, 8), keyboards (1, 4, 6, 7), percussion (3–5, 7–9)
- Burnt Friedman – drum programming and keyboards (3), toy piano (5, 9), Korg MS-20 (7, 9), vocoder (7), loops and pan (9)
- Keith Lowe – double bass (1), bass (2, 5, 7, 9)
- Stina Nordenstam – vocals (1)
- Arve Henriksen – trumpet (2, 4, 6)
- Hayden Chisholm – clarinet (3, 7–9), sax (5, 7)
- Theo Travis – sax (3 second solo, 5), flute (5)
- Thomas Hass – sax (3 first solo, 7)
- Morten Grønvad – vibraphone (3, 5, 7, 9)
- Carsten Skøv – vibraphone (3)
- Riff Pike III – electric guitar (3)
- Neal Sutherland – bass (3)
- Eska G. Mtungwazi, Marcina Arnold – backing vocals (3)
- Ryuichi Sakamoto – piano (4, 6), piano treatment (6)
- Beverlei Brown, Tommy Blaize – backing vocals (4, 7, 8)
- Andrea Grant, Derek Green – backing vocals (4)
- Tim Motzer – electric guitar (5, 8, 9), acoustic guitar (7)
- Tim Elsenburg – electric guitar (5)
- Joseph Suchy – electric guitar (7)
- Daniel Schroeter – bass (8)

Production

- David Sylvian, Steve Jansen – recording and mixing (at Samadhisound)
- Burnt Friedman – recording, mixing (7), editing (3, 5)
- David Sylvian – executive production, art direction
- Wes Mills – cover artwork
- Chris Bigg – design

== Charts ==
Chart performance for Snow Borne Sorrow
Chart (2024)	Peak position
Croatian International Albums (HDU)	12
