= Crown and Treaty =

Pub in Uxbridge, London

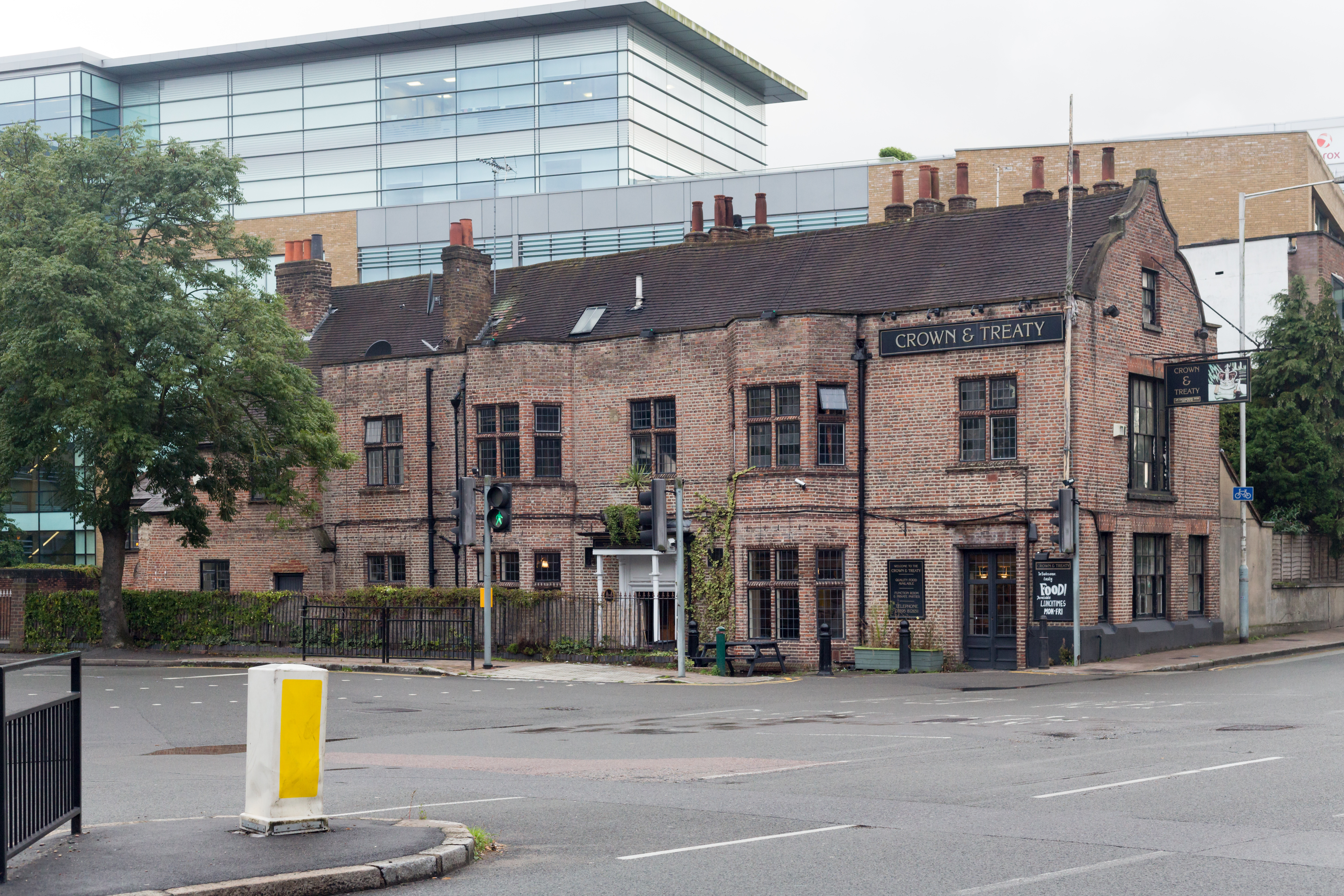
- The Crown and Treaty, 2017
- Interactive map of Crown and Treaty
- 51°33′00″N 0°29′03″W
- Location: 90 Oxford Road, Uxbridge, UB8 1LU, England

History
- Built: 1575
- Built for: John Bennett, as Place House

Site notes
- Current use: public house
- Website: thecrownandtreaty.co.uk

Listed Building – Grade II*
- Official name: Crown and Treaty Inn
- Designated: 8 May 1950
- Reference no.: 1080148

The Crown and Treaty is an historic building on Oxford Road in Uxbridge, England, dating from 1576. It was the site where Charles I and his parliamentary opponents attempted negotiations (the Treaty of Uxbridge) between 30 January and 22 February 1645 to end the English Civil War. It is a Grade II* listed building.

== Description ==
The building is grade II listed as of 8 May 1950, and is known for its intricate Jacobean wood panelling in the Treaty Room, where the Treaty of Uxbridge was signed following failed negotiations between Charles I and Oliver Cromwell.

The 2-storey red brick building was constructed in 1576. The front of the building faces south-east and has five windows across. The second and fourth windows from one end are set into bays protruding from the wall and run the full height of the building, with angled (rather than curved) sides. The brick was laid in a traditional pattern called English bond (alternating rows of bricks laid end-on and side-on). The top edge of the wall is capped with stone to protect it against weathering. The windows have brick uprights and horizontal bars dividing them into panels, and they are fitted with modern metal-framed windows that open on hinges, with small panes held in place by lead casements.

The original edifice was two thirds larger than it is today, part of it having been bulldozed when Oxford Road was widened to accommodate the coaching traffic in the eighteenth century. It was converted into a coaching inn under the auspices of Sir John Soane. Prior to becoming a pub, the building had been a Thai restaurant and a venue for live music.

=== Interior panelling ===
On 24 May 1930, it was announced that the original oak panelling with its elaborate carving had been sold to Louis L. Allen, a New York City antiques dealer for installation at his art gallery on Madison Avenue. Allen was an antiques dealer who primarily specialised in historical English artefacts. The panelling, which measured 21 feet 6 inches (6.55 m) by 18 feet 2 inches (5.54 m), continued below the floor level as the Treaty Room floor had been raised at some stage after the panels were installed.Connoisseur Magazine at the time reported that the panelling was "evidently added in the reign of James I", and was described as being "in practically perfect condition."

In 1945 businessman Armand Hammer bought the panelling and installed it in his private office on the 78th floor of the Empire State Building which he decorated to be a replica of the treaty room after the entire floor had to be gutted following the crash of a B-25. At the time it was a trend amongst the American ultra-wealthy to dismantle historic rooms from Europe still recovering from World War II and reinstalling them in the USA.

In 1953 Hammer gifted the panelling, and with it panelling from the smaller Presence Room, to Elizabeth II as a coronation gift. The Victoria and Albert Museum decided to return the rooms from whence they had come.

== Ownership history ==
Place House, as it was then known at the time, was built by and for Sir John Bennett as his residence. According to an article published in the Uxbridge Record, it was built in c1530 for Dr John Hughes, a lawyer employed by Cardial Wolsey.In 1689 upon the death of the last Bennett, ownership of the property passed to the Wentworth Gurney family, whose heirs divided his properties in 1724 with the building falling to a Charles Gosling. Afterwards the building remained a residence for Sir Christopher Abdy, one of the Abdy baronets of Felix Hall and subsequently to Dr. Thorold.

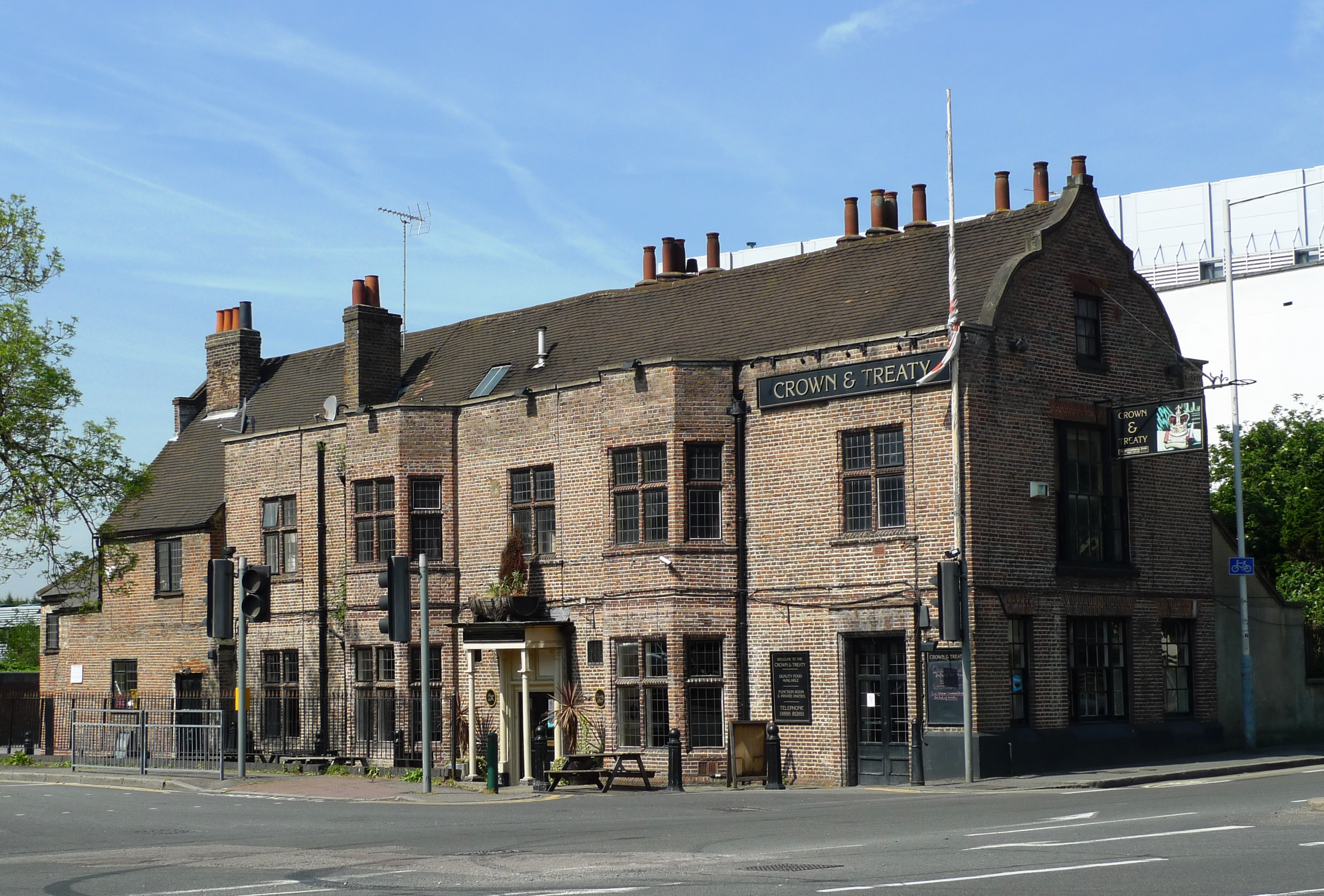
The Crown and Treaty, 2011

== Popular culture ==
Mercury Prize-nominated band Sweet Billy Pilgrim named their third album Crown and Treaty after the pub.

The pub became an internet meme after novelty candidate Count Binface included a manifesto pledge to move the hand dryer in the men's toilet in the 2019 general election when he was contesting the seat of Uxbridge and South Ruislip (and subsequent elections) Moving the hand dryer has been a repeated feature of Binface's election manifestos, although as of July 2026 he has not yet been elected. The hand dryer in question is located precariously close to a urinal rendering either it, or the hand dryer, inoperable while the other is in use. To that end, Binface signed a treaty with the pub to "move the hand dryer to a more sensible position" should he be elected to Parliament.
