= Money for All =

EP by Nine Horses
- Released: 16 January 2007
- Genre: Alternative rock
- Length: 44:35
- Label: Samadhi Sound
- Producer: Burnt Friedman (1, 3, 6, 7), David Sylvian (exc. 2, 8), Steve Jansen (2, 4, 5, 8)

David Sylvian chronology
Snow Borne Sorrow (2005)	Money for All (2007)	When Loud Weather Buffeted Naoshima (2007)

Professional ratings
Review scores
Source	Rating
AllMusic	

Money for All is an EP released 2007 by the band Nine Horses, featuring David Sylvian, Steve Jansen and Burnt Friedman. The EP includes three new songs: "Money for All," "Get the Hell Out," and "Birds Sing for Their Lives." The other five tracks are remixes.

== Background ==
Sylvian said about the project in 2012:

"It was actually started prior to Blemish. I was building a studio at the time and, upon completion, my brother (Steve Jansen) and I sat in the studio for a couple of weeks and started writing material together. And I was really happy with the material that we were writing together, but we were writing incredibly slowly. Put my brother and I in a room together and we can be very fastidious and really it can take a long time to produce a body of work, and I needed to do something more immediate because I hadn't created new work in such a long period of time. And I felt this burgeoning sense of something needing to be expressed and, you know, it was what was to become Blemish. So I just asked Steve if we could put this project on hold for a six week period and we'd get back to it.

On the Blemish tour I met up with Burnt Friedmann, and we expressed a desire to work together, so I started working on material with him for a supposedly different project. I finished that project and handed the material to Burnt. Burnt mixed it, and I felt that the material hadn't achieved its full potential, and I asked if he could send me the files so that I could have a bash at the material, and he was generous enough to do that. It kind of began to merge with the material that I was working on with Steve, and I added Steve to a lot of the tracks that Burnt and I had written together, and I think Burnt contributed something to the material that Steve and I had worked on together. So I basically became an overseer of these two separate projects and tried to bring them together as cohesively as I could. And they made sense. They made sense together. They complemented one another nicely.

And I was really proud of that record. I thought it was again not something that had been planned with a lot of forethought, but over time I became I began to envision it as a whole and managed to pull it together in a way that really made good sense to me. It was a return to the kind of songwriting that I'd been involved with for years. Now I find that I'm able to go back and forth quite easily between more traditional songwriting forms and more improvisational forms. They're just different strands of the work that I intend to continue producing. I don't see that they're at odds with one another. I enjoy the contrast, to be honest…

I loved working with Stina (Nordenstam). She's super talented. She's got this instrument that she knows perfectly well how to get the best out of."

== Track listing ==
All lyrics by David Sylvian except "Birds Sing for Their Lives" by Stina Nordenstam; all music by Sylvian and Burnt Friedman except where noted.

1. "Money for All" – 4:09
2. "Get the Hell Out" (Steve Jansen, Sylvian) – 5:37
3. "The Banality of Evil" (Burnt Friedman Remix) – 6:48
4. "Wonderful World" (Burnt Friedman Remix) – 7:04
5. "Birds Sing for Their Lives" – 7:02
6. "Serotonin" (Burnt Friedman Remix) – 4:51
7. "Money for All" (Version) – 4:00
8. "Get the Hell Out" (Burnt Friedman Remix) (Jansen, Sylvian) – 5:04

== Personnel ==
- David Sylvian – vocals, electric piano (1, 2, 7), guitar (1, 7), harmonica (1, 7), arrangement (3, 4, 6), mixing, art direction
- Steve Jansen – samples (2, 4, 8), drum programming (2, 8), percussion (4), keyboards (4), synth (8), mixing
- Hayden Chisholm – clarinet (exc. 2, 5, 8)
- Daniel Schröter – double bass (1, 5, 7), bass (6, 8)
- Burnt Friedman – drum programming (exc. 2, 5), synth (1, 3, 6, 7), effects (3, 4, 6), electronics (8)
- Morten Grønvad – vibraphone (1, 7)
- Beverlei Brown, Tommy Blaize – backing vocals (1, 6, 7)
- Andrea Grant, Derek Green – backing vocals (1, 7)
- Claudio Bohorquez – cello (3, 4)
- Thomas Elbern – acoustic guitar (3), electric guitar (4, 6)
- Joseph Suchy – guitar (3, 6)
- Norbert Krämer – timpani (4)
- Stina Nordenstam – vocals (4, 5)
- Tim Motzer – guitar (6)
- Alexander Meyen – violin (8)

== Additional personnel ==
- Atsushi Fukui – cover artwork
- Chris Bigg – design
