= Memories of a Color =

Studio album by Stina Nordenstam
- Released: 1991
- Genre: Alternative rock; jazz; trip hop
- Length: 46:38
- Label: Telegram Records Stockholm; Caprice Records
- Producer: Johan Ekelund; Stina Nordenstam

Stina Nordenstam chronology
Memories of a Color (1991)	And She Closed Her Eyes (1994)

Professional ratings
Review scores
Source	Rating
AllMusic	2.5/5 stars

Memories of a Color is the debut studio album by Swedish singer-songwriter Stina Nordenstam. It was originally released on Telegram Records Stockholm and Caprice Records in 1991.

== Track listing ==
All tracks are written by Stina Nordenstam

No.	Title	Length
1.	"Memories of a Color"	4:45
2.	"The Return of Alan Bean"	6:28
3.	"Another Story Girl"	3:38
4.	"His Song"	7:17
5.	"He Watches Her from Behind"	3:03
6.	"I'll Be Cryin' for You"	5:20
7.	"Alone at Night"	5:49
8.	"Soon After Christmas"	6:57
9.	"A Walk in the Park"	3:41
Total length:		46:38

== Personnel ==
Credits adapted from liner notes.

- Stina Nordenstam – vocals, piano, keyboards
- Mats Persson – percussion
- Magnus Persson – percussion
- André Ferrari – percussion
- Rafael Sida – percussion
- Christin Veltman – percussion
- Christian Spering – percussion
- Backa Hans Eriksson – bass guitar
- Max Schultz – bass guitar
- Ulf Janson – guitar
- Henrik Janson – guitar, keyboards
- Anders Persson – guitar, keyboards
- Johan Ekelund – keyboards
- Johan Hörlén — keyboards
- David Wilczewski – saxophone
- Lasse Andersson – guitars, cither
- Per Hammarström – violin
- Ronnie Sjökvist – violin
- Anna Harju – viola
- Kerstin Isaksson – cello
- Katarina Wassenius – cello
- Staffan Svensson – trumpet
- Johan Ahlin – French horn
- Jan Lejonclou – French horn

== Charts ==
Chart	Peak position
Swedish Albums (Sverigetopplistan)	27
