= Flanger (band) =

German music project

- Origin: Germany
- Genres: Nu jazz, electronic
- Years active: 1997–present
- Labels: Ntone; Ninja Tune; Nonplace
- Members: Uwe Schmidt; Burnt Friedman

The Flanger is a German music project, founded in 1997 by Uwe Schmidt (a.k.a. Atom Heart) and Bernd Friedmann (a.k.a. Burnt Friedman), who have both been active in the music business since the early 1990s. The two musicians met up to program their first album Templates at Mira Musica, Santiago de Chile in 1997. Their musical goal was to generate their own vision of non-repetitive, organic and extremely complex music that is far removed from the well-trodden paths of techno and other established styles of so-called contemporary music.

Templates was released the following year (1999) on Ntone, together with separate 12-inch pressings of several tracks. Clearly electronic, it moved beyond dance or electronic formulas, tapping into the spirit of exploration that characterised jazz during the '60s.

The success of this debut album convinced Flanger to do a second LP, which was recorded in Santiago de Chile, in March 1999. Entitled Midnight Sound, this was released on Ntone November 2000. Also referred to as Midnight Sounds. Midnight Sounds was the original title (and project name) for this album, but its originally intended label, KIFF SM, shut down before it could be released. The release of Midnight Sound prompted Uwe Schmidt and Bernd Friedmann, who are renowned for their very special shows, to consider the idea of live Flanger presentations.

Since then, they have released four albums, the first two created side by side in Chile, though for Inner/Outer Space the guide tracks were outlined separately yet finalised together and for 2005’s Spirituals, the biggest change of pace thus far, they did the opposite outlining the tunes together and producing them separately. On Spirituals, their fourth full-length album, they have collaborated with Sydney born Richard Pike a.k.a. Riff Jackson III of Pivot fame (and standin for Ewan McGregor in Star Wars) and his brother, drummer extraordinaire Laurence Pike a.k.a. MF Shakespeare of Triosk.

In 2007, the Nonplace label release "two in one" reissue of Flanger's first two albums together, called Nuclear Jazz. The only Flanger remix to date - produced in 1999 for the Italian artist Gak Sato - completes this "blistering set of instrumentals that snare both, the intellect and the hips".

== Discography ==
- Flanger EP (February 1999, Ntone, Cat. no: NTONE32, 12")
- Flanger EP2 (August 1999, Ntone, Cat. no: NTONE33, 12")
- Templates (15 June 1999, Ntone, Cat. no: NTONECD33, CD)
- Midnight Sound (2000, Ntone, Cat. no: NTONECD40, CD)
- Inner Spacesuit (8 October 2001, Ninja Tune, Cat. no: ZEN12105, 12")
- Outer Space / Inner Space (2001, Ninja Tune, Cat. no: ZEN61/ZENCD61, 2xLP/CD)
- Spirituals (2005, Nonplace, Cat. no: NON18, CD)
- Nuclear Jazz (Templates/Midnight Sound) (March 2007, Nonplace, Cat. no: NON21, CD)
- Lollopy Dripper (October 2015, Nonplace, Cat. no: NON41, CD)
