= Ingrid Chavez =

American vocalist and songwriter (born 1965)

- Born: Ingrid Julia Chavez; 21 January 1965 (age 61); Albuquerque, New Mexico, U.S.
- Occupations: Singer; songwriter
- Years active: 1988–present
- Spouse: David Sylvian (m. 1992; div. 2003)
- Children: 3
- Musical career
- Genres: Spoken word; poetry; dance
- Labels: Warner Bros.; Paisley Park; Ten Windows
- Website: ingridchavez.com

Ingrid Julia Chavez (born January 21, 1965) is an American singer-songwriter.

== Early life ==
Chavez was born on January 21, 1965, in Albuquerque, New Mexico, and raised in Marietta, Georgia. She is of Mexican-American descent. At the age of 10, she was sent by her mother to live with relatives in Atlanta, Georgia.

Living in a rundown neighbourhood of Atlanta with Steve Snow, her musician boyfriend at the time, and her newborn, she decided to relocate to Minneapolis — her boyfriend's hometown — after a burglary of their home, to pursue a career in music.

== Career ==
After moving to Minneapolis, in 1986, she auditioned for a number of bands, made the rounds of the Minneapolis music scene, and paid her bills working in a coffee shop. She met Prince in a pub in late 1987, having written to him. Impressed by Chavez's voice and poetry, Prince took Chavez under his wing. She was known as The Spirit Child on his 1988 Lovesexy album (She does the outro on Alphabet St. amongst other things). Prince encouraged Chavez to write 21 poems with the promise that they would make a poetry album together. In January 1988, Ingrid and Prince recorded The Poetry Session at Paisley Park Studios. Prince improvised on keyboards while Ingrid recited her poetry. Shortly after this session the project was put on hold.

In 1989, Chavez formed a band called Skyfish with Richard Werbowenko. They created a six-song album released only on cassette. Chavez ran into Prince a year or so later and handed him a copy of the Skyfish demo. Shortly after the exchange, Prince contacted Chavez and wanted her to listen to a track that he had just finished with the poem "Heaven Must Be Near". Prince asked Chavez to finish the poetry album.

It was at this time that Chavez was asked to play the part of Prince's romantic interest in his 1990 film Graffiti Bridge. During the filming Chavez went into the studio with Lenny Kravitz and Andre Betts and co-wrote and recorded what became Madonna's sultry 1990 hit "Justify My Love". She received a large out-of-court settlement for not being credited on the single's release.

In 1992, not long after recording vocals with David Sylvian for the songs "Heartbeat (Tainai Kaiki II) - Returning to the Womb" and "Cloud #9" on Ryuichi Sakamoto's 1991 album Heartbeat, Chavez married Sylvian, and over the years contributed her trademark breathy vocals to a number of her baritone-voiced husband's releases.

During the mid-1990s, Chavez worked with Sylvian and Werbowenko on a second solo album titled Little Girls with 99 Lives. Chavez and Sylvian sent out demos to record labels and close friends, yet could not strike up interest in a deal. The album would have included tracks entitled "Lighthouse", "Snowfall", "Whose Trip Is This?", "Starred and Dreaming", "Kall/Les Fleurs Du Mal", and "Remembering Julia"—the latter four of which can be found as B-sides on the 2-CD UK single of David Sylvian's "I Surrender". These four tracks were later collected and released as an EP titled "Little Girl with 99 Lives" in 2010 through Ingrid's Ten Windows records.

In 1996, Tommy Roberts, a former Minneapolis recording engineer who recorded the Skyfish demo, contacted Chavez and asked her to be in a band with him. She joined the band, called Ova, and recorded a four-song EP. Chavez became pregnant and decided to let go of the project and focus on her family.

Chavez teamed up with Chicago native, Marco Valentin to form the duo Black Eskimo in 2011. The 12-song full-length Deep & Heady CD was released on November 25, 2013, via Bandcamp. Their song "My Sky" won for Song of the Year (Spoken Word Category) at the 14th Annual Independent Music Awards. In celebration of this award the My Sky Poetry and Music Journal was released. This was the first album released in a physical format as a poetry and music journal.

Ingrid's third solo album was due to be released in late 2018. Memories of Flying features collaborations with Charles Webster, Ganga, Mashti, Deep Dive Corp., Marco Valentin, and David Hurn.

== Personal life ==
Chavez has a son born circa 1984 in Atlanta, Georgia. She also has two daughters with English singer and musician David Sylvian, whom she married in 1992 and divorced in 2003; the disintegration of the marriage informed Sylvian's 2003 studio album Blemish. Chavez was reported living in Peterborough, New Hampshire, in 2016.

== Discography ==
=== Albums ===
- May 19, 1992 (1992, Paisley Park/Warner Bros. Records)
- Little Girls With 99 Lives (2010, Ten Windows Records)
- A Flutter and Some Words (2010, Ten Window Records)

=== EPs ===
- By the Water Reimagined (2010, Ten Windows Records
- Deep
- Heady
- Deep & Heady
- Memories Of Flying (2019, Ten Windows Records

=== Singles and appearances ===
- Ganga feat. Ingrid Chavez "Non Toxic"
- Ganga feat. Ingrid Chavez "Non Toxic Remixed EP"
- Vanessa Daou "Revolution (Black Eskimo's Memories of Flying Re-imagining)"
- P.C. Muñoz (feat. Ingrid Chavez) "Disappear"
- Saffon Wood "Visit Dream (feat. Ingrid Chavez)" [2017]
- Mashti "Out of Love (feat. Ingrid Chavez)" [2018]
- "You Gave Me Wings" [2018]
- "Ride (Balearic Mix by Deep Dive Corp.)" [2019]
- "All The Love In The World" [2019]
- "Light Rays" [2019]
