= People Are Strange (album) =

Studio album by Stina Nordenstam
- Released: 23 April 1998
- Studio: Sweet Silence Studios, Copenhagen
- Genre: Alternative rock
- Length: 36:47
- Label: EastWest
- Producer: Ian Caple; Stina Nordenstam

Stina Nordenstam chronology
| Dynamite (1996) | People Are Strange (1998) | This Is Stina Nordenstam (2001) |

Professional ratings
Review scores
| Source | Rating |
|---|---|
| AllMusic | 3.5/5 stars |

People Are Strange is a studio album by Swedish singer-songwriter Stina Nordenstam. It was originally released on EastWest Records in 1998.

== Track listing ==
| No. | Title | Writer(s) | Original artist(s) | Length |
|---|---|---|---|---|
| 1. | "Sailing" | Gavin Sutherland | The Sutherland Bros. Band | 3:15 |
| 2. | "I Dream of Jeannie (with Light Brown Hair)" | Stephen Foster | | 3:56 |
| 3. | "Love Hurts" | Boudleaux Bryant | The Everly Brothers | 0:33 |
| 4. | "Lonesome Road" | Nathaniel Shilkret; Gene Austin | | 2:08 |
| 5. | "Bird on a Wire" | Leonard Cohen | Leonard Cohen | 3:42 |
| 6. | "Purple Rain" | Prince | Prince | 3:52 |
| 7. | "Swallow Strings" | Stina Nordenstam | | 1:10 |
| 8. | "Like a Swallow" | Traditional | | 2:46 |
| 9. | "Reason to Believe" | Tim Hardin | Rod Stewart | 4:11 |
| 10. | "I Came So Far for Beauty" | Leonard Cohen; John Lissauer | Leonard Cohen | 4:01 |
| 11. | "Come to Me" | Stina Nordenstam | | 3:31 |
| 12. | "People Are Strange" | Robby Krieger; Jim Morrison | The Doors | 3:35 |
| Total length: | | | | 36:47 |

Japanese edition bonus disc
| No. | Title | Writer(s) | Original artist(s) | Length |
|---|---|---|---|---|
| 1. | "People Are Strange (UNKLE Remix)" | Robby Krieger; Jim Morrison | | 5:43 |
| 2. | "Treat Me Nice" | Jerry Leiber; Mike Stoller | Elvis Presley | 3:47 |
| Total length: | | | | 9:30 |

In the booklet, "Lonesome Road" is credited to Traditional, "Bird on a Wire" to Charlotte Deaver, "Purple Rain" to Nelson, "People Are Strange" to Morrison/Manzarek/Densmore/Krieger, and "Swallow Strings" is uncredited.
