= Samadhi Sound =

Independent record label founded by David Sylvian

Samadhi Sound (or samadhisound) was an independent record label founded by singer and musician David Sylvian after his departure from Virgin Records in the late nineties.

The label mainly served as a platform for Sylvian to release his own work – the album Blemish was the first to appear on Samadhi Sound in 2003 – and that of artists usually associated to him, like his brother Steve Jansen and Harold Budd. Nine Horses, a collaboration between Sylvian, Jansen, and Burnt Friedman, released their 2005 album Snow Borne Sorrow on Samadhi Sound.

== Artists ==
- Derek Bailey
- Jan Bang
- Harold Budd
- Thomas Feiner
- Steve Jansen
- Toshimaru Nakamura
- Nine Horses
- Akira Rabelais
- David Sylvian
- David Toop

== Releases ==
- SS001: David Sylvian – Blemish
- SS002: David Sylvian & Ryuichi Sakamoto – World Citizen
- SS003: Akira Rabelais – Spellewauerynsherde
- SS004: Harold Budd – Avalon Sutra / As Long as I Can Hold My Breath
- SS005: David Sylvian – The Good Son vs. The Only Daughter (The Blemish Remixes)
- SS006: Nine Horses – Snow Borne Sorrow
- SS007: Nine Horses – Wonderful World
- SS008: Derek Bailey – To Play – The Blemish Sessions
- SS009: David Toop – Sound Body
- SS010: Nine Horses – Money for All
- SS011: David Sylvian – When Loud Weather Buffeted Naoshima
- SS012: Steve Jansen – Slope
- SS013: Thomas Feiner & Anywhen – The Opiates – Revised
- SS014: The World Is Everything Tour Book Sampler CD
- SS015: Sweet Billy Pilgrim – Twice Born Men
- SS016: David Sylvian – Manafon
- SS017: Toshimaru Nakamura – Egrets
- SS018: Jan Bang – ...And Poppies from Kandahar
- SS019: Akira Rabelais – Caduceus
- SS020: David Sylvian – Sleepwalkers (remix compilation CD)
- SS021: David Sylvian – Died in the Wool – Manafon Variations
- SS022: Jan Bang & Erik Honore – Uncommon Deities
- SS023: Stephan Mathieu & David Sylvian – Wandermüde
- SS024: David Sylvian – there's a light that enters houses with no other house in sight
- SOUND-DL001: Harold Budd – Perhaps
- SOUND-DL002: Steve Jansen – Swimming in Qualia (Ascent)
- SOUND-DL003: Steve Jansen – Slope Remixes
- SOUND-DL004: Steve Jansen – The Occurrence of Slope
- SOUND10-001: David Sylvian – Do You Know Me Now? (10" Ltd Vinyl)
- SSDVD01: David Sylvian – Amplified Gesture (DVD Documentary)
- SOUND-OP001: David Sylvian – Hypergraphia – The Writings of David Sylvian 1980 – 2014 (Book of lyrics, poems & interviews)

== See also ==
- Lists of record labels
