= The World Is Saved =

Studio album by Stina Nordenstam
- Released: 1 January 2004
- Studio: Traxton Recording; Atlantis Gramophone; David's studio; Stina's apartment
- Genre: Alternative rock
- Length: 41:49
- Label: V2
- Producer: Stina Nordenstam

Stina Nordenstam chronology
This Is Stina Nordenstam (2001)	The World Is Saved (2004)

Professional ratings
Review scores
Source	Rating
AllMusic	4/5 stars
Robert Christgau	(dud)
The Guardian	4/5 stars
Pitchfork	8.6/10
Slant Magazine	3/5 stars

The World Is Saved is a studio album by Swedish singer-songwriter Stina Nordenstam. It was released on V2 Records in 2004.

== Track listing ==
All tracks are written by Stina Nordenstam

No.	Title	Length
1.	"Get On with Your Life"	3:28
2.	"Winter Killing"	4:02
3.	"On Falling"	4:09
4.	"Parliament Square"	4:34
5.	"I'm Staring Out the World"	3:38
6.	"From Cayman Islands with Love"	3:58
7.	"The Morning Belongs to the Night"	3:32
8.	"125"	3:40
9.	"Butterfly"	4:20
10.	"The World Is Saved"	2:52
11.	"The End of a Love Affair"	3:36
Total length:		41:49

Expanded edition bonus tracks
No.	Title	Length
12.	"Get On with Your Life (Pluxus Remix)"	3:43
13.	"The End of a Love Affair (Faultline Mix)"	3:59
14.	"Failing to Fly"	3:33
Total length:		53:04

== Personnel ==
Credits adapted from liner notes.

- Stina Nordenstam – vocals, guitar, keyboards, arrangement, production
- Magnus Carlson – vocals (3, 6)
- Goran Kajfeš – trumpet
- Björn Erikson – French horn
- Per Johansson a.k.a. Texas – saxophone, clarinet
- Per Johansson a.k.a. Ruskträsk – flute
- Jakob Ruthberg – violin, viola
- Isabel Blommé – cello
- Jesper Nordenström – piano, organ
- Mattias Torell – guitar, mandolin, bass guitar
- Johan Berthling – bass guitar, double bass
- Magnus Örström – drums
- Jonas Sjöblom – vibraphone, drums, percussion
- John Erickson – vibraphone, marimba, funeral drum
- Jonas Nyström – string arrangement
- David Österberg – programming, recording, engineering
- Tchad Blake – mixing
- Adam Ayan – mastering
- Jonas Linell – photography

== Charts ==
Chart	Peak position
French Albums (SNEP)	119
Swedish Albums (Sverigetopplistan)	5
