= Spellewauerynsherde =

2004 album by Akira Rabelais

Studio album by Akira Rabelais
- Released: March 13, 2004
- Recorded: 2003–2004
- Genre: Electronic; avant-garde; ambient; experimental; laments
- Length: 56:32
- Label: Samadhi Sound
- Producer: Akira Rabelais

Akira Rabelais chronology
...Bénédiction, Draw. (2003)	Spellewauerynsherde (2004)	A.M. Station (2005)

Spellewauerynsherde is a studio album by American experimental composer and multimedia artist Akira Rabelais, released in March 2004 as a limited edition CD on Samadhi Sound, followed by a vinyl reissue spanning three editions by Boomkat Editions in 2017. It is best known as being an experimental electronic cult classic and as one of Rabelais' most profound and detailed (while being sparse and minimalist in tone) works.

== Background ==
Spellewauerynsherde (spell wavering shard) was created with Rabelais' own experimental electroacoustic audio processing software, Argeïphontes Lyre, which he had begun his musical career creating material for albums with, with varying musical sources. For example, on Eisoptrophobia (2001), he processed recordings of himself playing impressionist piano pieces, and on ...Bénédiction, Draw. (2003), he processed recordings of guitar improvisations and extended them. However, Spellewauerynsherde was created from vocal recordings due to a circumstance that Rabelais appreciated: while looking through his closet, he came across a cassette tape of what appeared to be Icelandic female lament songs recorded in the 1960s and 1970s. Intrigued by the content of the tape, he digitally cleaned up the recordings, and began processing and rearranging them with Argeïphontes Lyre, leading to the creation of the album. "I didn't want to abstract it so much that it lost its essential quality," said Rabelais of the source material; "I didn't want to damage the fabric of the original language, I wanted to set it, cast it in a certain light."

The album, despite its primarily avant-garde style, has an ambient tone which has been described as 'a curious and compelling mixture of the medieval and the modern'. Being that the album is entirely composed of and processed from vocal recordings, it has been described as an experimental a cappella record.

The track titles on the album are composed of definitions from early editions of the Oxford English Dictionary (including references to the works of English poets John Gower and John Milton) which Rabelais has confessed to being inspired by: the album is accompanied by a poem written by Rabelais which features Old English spellings of words.

== Composition ==
On the opening track, "1382 Wyclif Gen. ii. 7", a vocal line, the first that is sampled from the lament song recordings used on Spellewauerynsherde, 'slips gently into a kind of canonic imitation of itself as a cloud of reverberant resonance drifts in from afar'. The centerpiece of the album, "1483 Caxton Golden Leg. 208 b/2", is a distinctive drone piece that, while incorporating tones from the recordings, is 'gather[ed] into an eerie microtonal cloud' that has been compared to György Ligeti's choral works that were used in 2001: A Space Odyssey. Meanwhile, "(Gorgeous Curves Lovely Fragments...)" is the album's most expressive piece, with multitracked and backmasked arrangements of another individual lament song that occasionally dip out into reverberation. The album closes with "1671 Milton Samson 1122", a reprise of the opening track which features more reverberation and droning.

== Critical reception ==
Upon its 2017 vinyl reissue (on both clear and gold vinyl) by Boomkat Editions (which Rabelais specifically created a reedit of the album for), record distributor Boomkat praised Spellewauerynsherde, calling it 'one of the 21st century’s most enigmatic and haunting albums'. They commented that on the album, he performs a 'hypermodern animism on ostensibly dead musical material — dead as in hardly anyone knows or plays them in the modern age', calling the overall album 'one of the most magickal, perplexing and strangely life-giving records that you’ll likely ever hear'.

== Track listing ==
No.	Title	Length
1.	"1382 Wyclif Gen. ii. 7 and Spiride in the Face of Hym an Entre of Breth of Lijf"	6:18
2.	"1390 Gower Conf. II. 20 I Can Noght Thanne Unethes Spelle That I Wende Altherbest Have Rad"	7:24
3.	"1440 Promp. Parv. 518/20 Wawyn, or Waueryn, Yn a Myry Totyr, Oscillo."	6:36
4.	"1483 Caxton Golden Leg. 208b/2 He Put Not Away the Wodenes of His Flesh With a Shrede or Shelle."	21:15
5.	"1559 W. Cuningham Cosmogr. Glasse 125 Within Which Draw an Other Circle, a Finger Bredth Distant"	0:44
6.	"(Gorgeous Curves Lovely Fragments Labyrinthed on Occasions Entwined Charms, a Few Stories at Any Longer Swrn to Gathered From a Guileless Angel and the Hilt Edges of Old Hearts, If They Do in the Guilt of Deep Despondency)"	6:09
7.	"1671 Milton Samson 1122 Add Thy Spear, a Weavers Beam, and Seven-Times-Folded Shield."	8:06
Total length:		56:32
