= Sarah Peebles =

Canadian-American composer, improviser and installation artist

Sarah Peebles is a Toronto-based Canadian - American composer, improviser and installation artist originally from Minnesota (USA). Much of her work explores digitally manipulated found sound, unconventional methods of amplification, and distinct approaches to improvisation on the shō (笙), the Japanese mouth-organ used in gagaku (Japan's imperial court music). Her installation practice focuses on BioArt which explores the lives of native wild bees, pollination ecology and biodiversity. Collectively titled “Resonating Bodies”, much of this activity is in collaboration with other artists, technicians and bee biologists.

Peebles' approach to the shō draws from gagaku, microtonality and psychoacoustic phenomena of the instrument, and many of her works alter its tuning and microphone placement in creating recordings of performances. She has released several recordings which include the instrument, including the album “Delicate Paths” (Unsounds 42U, 2014), which highlights her distinct approaches to performing, recording and composing for the shō. That album features a foreword and images dedicated to the instrument's ethnobotanical and ethnozoological connections to ancient Asia, and includes guest performers Evan Parker, Nilan Perera, and Suba Sankaran.

Peebles' “Resonating Bodies” projects, initiated in 2008, feature a series of amplified habitat sculptures for solitary bees, titled "Audio Bee Booths" and "Audio Bee Cabinets". These permanent outdoor works utilize cabinetry and other woodworking, electronics, pyrography, and earth-based building techniques (adobe and cob). Resonating Bodies, is a series of integrated media installations, community outreach projects and a web site which illuminates aspects of Canada's biodiversity through focusing on pollination ecology, with special attention paid to the intersection of native bees, habitat and coevolution of plants and pollinators of the Greater Toronto Area and beyond (See "Resonating Bodies" at wordpress and on Facebook).

Other activities over the past 3 decades have been wide-ranging, including music for dance, multi-channel sound, radio, video/film, performance art and integrated media, sound installation and improvised performance; the duo “Smash and Teeny” with guitarist Nilan Perera, and trio “Cinnamon Sphere” with Perera and painter Chung Gong.

Her music is published on Unsounds, Cycling '74, innova Recordings, Spool, Post-Concrète, CBC Music, Sonus.ca (Canadian Electroacoustic Community's free library) and others.
