= And She Closed Her Eyes =

Studio album by Stina Nordenstam
- Released: January 1994
- Genre: Alternative rock
- Length: 49:14
- Label: Telegram Records Stockholm
- Producer: Erik Holmberg; Stina Nordenstam

Stina Nordenstam chronology
Memories of a Color (1991)	And She Closed Her Eyes (1994)	Dynamite (1996)

Professional ratings
Review scores
Source	Rating
AllMusic	4/5 stars

And She Closed Her Eyes is the second studio album by Swedish singer-songwriter Stina Nordenstam. It was released on Telegram Records Stockholm in 1994.

In 2013, the Swedish music magazine Sonic named And She Closed Her Eyes the best Swedish album ever.

== Track listing ==
All tracks are written by Stina Nordenstam

No.	Title	Length
1.	"When Debbie's Back from Texas"	4:08
2.	"Viewed from the Spire"	3:49
3.	"Crime"	5:40
4.	"Fireworks"	5:46
5.	"Proposal"	1:56
6.	"Little Star"	3:42
7.	"Hopefully Yours"	4:44
8.	"Murder in Mairyland Park"	4:12
9.	"I See You Again"	3:26
10.	"So This Is Goodbye"	4:35
11.	"Something Nice"	4:42
12.	"And She Closed Her Eyes"	2:34
Total length:		49:14

Japanese edition bonus track
No.	Title	Length
13.	"First Day in Spring"	2:53
Total length:		52:07

Cassette edition hidden track
No.	Title	Length
13.	"Remember That Rainy Day"	4:08
Total length:		53:22

== Personnel ==
Credits adapted from liner notes.

- Stina Nordenstam – vocals, guitar, production
- Erik Holmberg – keyboards, guitar, drums, percussion, production
- Mats Lindfors – guitar (6), recording, mix engineering
- Sara Hammarström – flute
- Martin Green – saxophone
- Johan Hörlén – saxophone
- Jocke Milder – saxophone
- Jon Hassell – trumpet
- Fleshquartet – strings
- Johan Norberg – guitar
- Jonas Arlert – guitar
- Popsicle – guitar, bass guitar, vocals
- Lars Danielsson – bass guitar
- Sten Forsman – bass guitar
- Simon Nordell – vocals
- Joakim Ljungberg Isaksson – vocals
- Carl Slettengren – vocals
- Christer Linder – vocals
- Kent (Gillström) Isaacs – vocals, instruments, co-production (6)

== Charts ==
Chart (1994)	Peak position
Swedish Albums (Sverigetopplistan)	5
