= Mayumi Miyata =

Japanese shō player

Mayumi Miyata 宮田 まゆみ
- Born: April 1, 1954 (age 72); Tokyo, Japan
- Genre: Contemporary classical music
- Occupation: Musician
- Instrument: Shō
- Years active: 1979–present

Mayumi Miyata (宮田 まゆみ, Miyata Mayumi) is a Japanese player of the shō, a traditional Japanese mouth organ.

Miyata was born on April 1, 1954, in Tokyo and graduated from the Kunitachi College of Music, where she majored in piano. While in school, she began studying gagaku music from Ono Tadamaro of the Imperial Household Agency. From 1979 she performed in gagaku concerts at the National Theatre of Japan, and from 1983 she began giving solo shō recitals, which brought her wider public attention.

Although the shō is generally associated with Japan's ancient gagaku court music, Miyata was among the first players of the instrument to specialize in contemporary classical music. She plays a specially constructed instrument with extra pipes, allowing for the use of more chromaticism.

The US composer John Cage (1912–1992) composed a number of works for Miyata just before his death. Cage met her during the 1990 Darmstadt summer course. She has also premiered works by Tōru Takemitsu, Toshi Ichiyanagi, Maki Ishii, Joji Yuasa, Klaus Huber, Toshio Hosokawa, and Uroš Rojko, and has performed with major orchestras internationally, including the Saito Kinen Orchestra under Seiji Ozawa, the NHK Symphony Orchestra under Charles Dutoit, the New York Philharmonic under André Previn, and the Czech Philharmonic under Vladimir Ashkenazy.

In 1998, Miyata performed the Japanese national anthem, "Kimigayo", at the opening ceremony of the 1998 Winter Olympics in Nagano.

In 2005, Miyata performed in three songs by the Icelandic musician Björk, for the soundtrack album to Drawing Restraint 9, a film by Björk's contemporary media artist boyfriend Matthew Barney, about Japanese culture and whaling. Miyata also appeared in the film, playing the shō in one scene. Previously, a piece written for and recorded by Miyata, "Music for Shō and Harp" by Cort Lippe, was sampled in the Björk single, "Venus as a Boy".

She has performed in Japan, Australia, the United States, and Europe.

== Discography ==
- Chaya Czernowin: Die Kreuzung - on Mode Records 77 (1996)
- John Cage Edition Vol. 23 - Two^{4} - on Mode Records 88 (2001)
- John Cage Edition Vol. 26 - One^{9} - on Mode Records 108 (2003)
- Helmut Lachenmann: Das Mädchen mit den Schwefelhölzern - ECM New Series (2 CDs) 1858/59 (2004)
- Toshio Hosokawa - Landscapes - ECM New Series 2095 (2011)

== Honours ==
- Kawasaki Cultural Award (1/新人賞) — Arts Encouragement Prize (1986)
- 37th Matsuo Geinō Award, Excellence Prize (2016)
- 67th Arts Encouragement Prize (Minister of Education Award) (2017)
- Medal with Purple Ribbon (2018)
- Japan Foundation Award (2021)
