= This Is Stina Nordenstam =

Studio album by Stina Nordenstam
- Released: 5 November 2001
- Genre: Alternative rock
- Length: 31:18
- Label: Independiente
- Producer: Mitchell Froom; Tchad Blake; Stina Nordenstam

Stina Nordenstam chronology
People Are Strange (1998)	This Is Stina Nordenstam (2001)	The World Is Saved (2004)

Professional ratings
Review scores
Source	Rating
AllMusic	3/5 stars

This Is Stina Nordenstam is an album by Swedish singer-songwriter Stina Nordenstam, released in 2001. It is Nordenstam's only release on Independiente Records.

Stina Nordenstam plays guitar, keyboards and sings all vocals, but is joined by Suede lead singer Brett Anderson on the songs "Trainsurfing" and "Keen Yellow Planet". She is also assisted by three musicians, Davey Faragher (bass), Pete Thomas (drums) and Val McCallum (guitar) (Faragher and Thomas have both previously played with Elvis Costello).

== Track listing ==
All tracks are written by Stina Nordenstam.

No.	Title	Length
1.	"Everyone Else in the World"	2:59
2.	"Trainsurfing"	3:10
3.	"So Lee"	2:56
4.	"The Diver"	3:19
5.	"Circus"	3:19
6.	"Stations"	3:07
7.	"Keen Yellow Planet"	3:04
8.	"Lori Glory"	3:01
9.	"Welcome to Happiness"	2:51
10.	"Clothe Yourself for the Wind"	1:35
11.	"Sharon & Hope"	2:31
Total length:		31:18

== Charts ==
Chart	Peak position
French Albums (SNEP)	135
Swedish Albums (Sverigetopplistan)	26
