= Stina Nordenstam =

Swedish singer

- Born: Kristina Ulrika Marianne Nordenstam; 4 March 1969 (age 56); Stockholm, Sweden
- Genres: Alternative rock; ambient pop; folk; jazz
- Occupation: Singer
- Years active: 1990–2007
- Labels: East West; Independiente; V2

Kristina Ulrika Marianne Nordenstam (born 4 March 1969) is a Swedish singer-songwriter and producer.

== Life and career ==
Nordenstam was born in Stockholm on 4 March 1969. As a child, she was highly influenced by her father's classical and jazz music collection. Her debut album, Memories of a Color, was released in 1991. Her sophomore album And She Closed Her Eyes, released in 1994, was named the best Swedish album of all time by Sonic on their 2013 list of the 100 best Swedish albums. 1997's Dynamite began a more experimental path—most of the album was filled with distorted guitars and unusual beats. A 1998 cover album, People Are Strange, followed in the same vein. In 2001, Nordenstam went with a more pop-influenced sound on This Is Stina Nordenstam, which features guest vocals from Brett Anderson. Nordenstam's 2004 album The World Is Saved continued the path set on This Is..., and is her last album as of 2025.

Her song "Little Star" was used in the 1996 Baz Luhrman film Romeo + Juliet. She appears on two songs by English band Nine Horses, on the album Snow Borne Sorrow and on the EP Money for All. She also provided vocals for Vangelis' song "Ask the Mountains", Yello's "To the Sea", and a collaboration with Anton Fier. In 2000, Nordenstam featured on a track from Danish prog-rockers Mew's second album Half the World Is Watching Me. The track was later re-recorded for the band's international debut Frengers. Nordenstam's vocals on her track "A Walk in the Park" were used as a sample for two songs by the Canadian electronic duo Crystal Castles, "Violent Dreams" and "Vietnam".

Nordenstam presented a sound installation at the Way Out West music festival in 2013, and, in 2014, Nordenstam was one of 12 inaugural inductees into the Swedish Music Hall of Fame.

== Musical style ==
Nordenstam's voice was called "delicate", "serious", and "plucky" by Autostraddle. The Irish Times described Nordenstam's voice as "childlike" with "hushed and fragile" tones and a "soft and gentle" timbre, contrasting it with her "mighty and immeasurable" sound. Her voice was described by Adam Brent Houghtaling, author of This Will End in Tears: The Miserablist Guide to Music, as "very fragile" and "wispy", and he stated that her music "melds a lot of jazz and folk and ambient pop all together". Her music has also been described as avant-pop. Sally Shapiro has listed Nordenstam as an influence on her music.

== Personal life ==
In a 2013 interview, Nordenstam revealed that she was diagnosed with autism.

== Discography ==
=== Studio albums ===
List of studio albums, with selected chart positions
Title	Album details	Peak chart positions	
Title	Album details	SWE	FR
Memories of a Color	Released: December 1991; Label: Telegram, Caprice, EastWest; Formats: CD, LP, cassette	27	—
And She Closed Her Eyes	Released: January 1994; Label: Telegram, EastWest; Formats: CD, LP, cassette	5	—
Dynamite	Released: 13 September 1996; Label: Telegram, EastWest; Formats: CD, cassette	17	—
People Are Strange	Released: 23 April 1998; Label: EastWest; Formats: CD, CD-R	—	—
This Is Stina Nordenstam	Released: 5 November 2001; Label: Independiente; Formats: CD, CD-R, DVD	26	135
The World Is Saved	Released: 1 January 2004; Label: V2, P-Vine, Beacon Sound; Formats: CD, LP, CD-R	5	119

=== EPs ===
List of studio albums, with selected chart positions
Title	Album details
The Photographer's Wife (with Anton Fier)	Released: August 1996; Label: Telegram, EastWest; Formats: CD, LP

=== Singles ===
==== As lead artist ====
List of singles, with year released, selected chart positions, certifications, and album name shown
Title	Year	Peak chart positions		Album
Title	Year	SWE	UK	Album
"Memories of a Color"	1992	—	—	Memories of a Color
"Another Story Girl"	1993	—	—	Memories of a Color
"Little Star"	1993	—	—	And She Closed Her Eyes
"Something Nice"	1994	—	100	And She Closed Her Eyes
"Dynamite"	1997	—	—	Dynamite
"People Are Strange"	1998	—	—	People Are Strange
"Sharon & Hope"	2002	—	—	This Is Stina Nordenstam
"Get On with Your Life"	2004	35	—	The World Is Saved
"Parliament Square"	2005	—	—	The World Is Saved

==== As featured artist ====
List of singles, with year released, selected chart positions, certifications, and album name shown
Title	Year	Peak chart positions				Album
Title	Year	SWE	DEN	SWI	UK	Album
"Ask the Mountains" (Vangelis featuring Stina Nordenstam)	1996	—	—	—	77	Voices
"To the Sea" (Yello featuring Stina Nordenstam)	1997	48	83	23	—	Pocket Universe

=== Guest appearances ===
- Fleshquartet – "Dancin' Madly Backwards", "It Won't Hurt Me", "Walk", and "Someone like Me" from Flow (1993)
- Yello – "To the Sea" from Pocket Universe (1996)
- Zbigniew Preisner – Aberdeen: Original Film Soundtrack (2000)
- Mew – "Her Voice Is Beyond Her Years" from Half the World Is Watching Me (2000)
- Mew – "Her Voice Is Beyond Her Years" from Frengers (2003)
- Nine Horses – "Wonderful World" from Snow Borne Sorrow (2005)
- Filur – "Into the Wasteland" from Into the Wasteland (2006)
- Nine Horses – "Wonderful World (Burnt Friedman Remix)" and "Birds Sing for Their Lives" from Money for All (2007)
