= Shō (instrument) =

Japanese mouth organ instrument

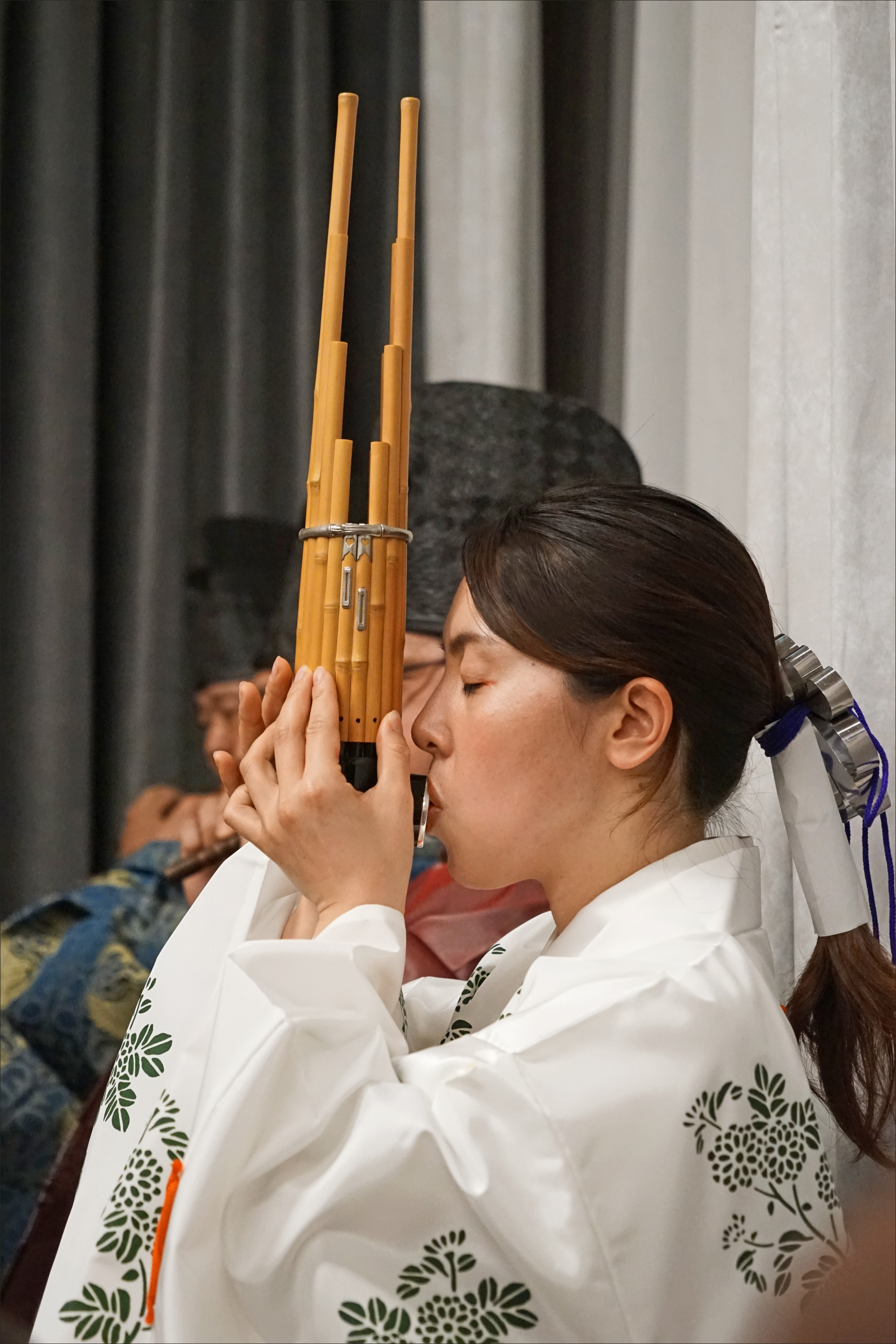
- Musician playing sho

Woodwind
- Classification: Japanese; Free reed; Aerophone; Free reed aerophone
- Hornbostel–Sachs classification: 441.21 (sho Japanese instrument)

Related instruments
- Sheng; Khene; Bawu; Harmonica

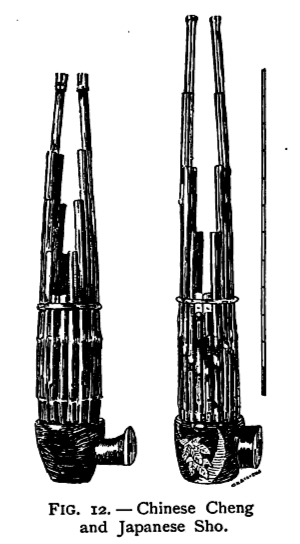
Chinese sheng (L) and Japanese shō (R)

Standard chords (aitake) of the shō

The shō (笙) is a Japanese free reed musical instrument descended from the Chinese sheng, of the Tang dynasty era, which was introduced to Japan during the Nara period (AD 710 to 794), although the shō tends to be smaller in size than its contemporary sheng relatives. It consists of 17 slender bamboo pipes, each of which is fitted in its base with a metal free reed. Two of the pipes are silent, although research suggests that they were used in some music during the Heian period. It is speculated that even though the pipes are silent, they were kept as part of the instrument to keep the symmetrical shape.

The instrument's sound is said to imitate the call of a phoenix, and it is for this reason that the two silent pipes of the shō are kept—as an aesthetic element, making two symmetrical "wings". Similar to the Chinese sheng, the pipes are tuned carefully with a drop of a dense resinous wax preparation containing fine lead shot. As (breath) moisture collected in the shō's pipes prevents it from sounding, performers can be seen warming the instrument over a small charcoal brazier or electric burner when they are not playing. The instrument produces sound when the player's breath is inhaled or exhaled, allowing long periods of uninterrupted play. The shō is one of the three primary woodwind instruments used in gagaku, Japan's imperial court music. Its traditional playing technique in gagaku involves the use of tone clusters called aitake (合竹), which move gradually from one to the other, providing accompaniment to the melody.

A larger size of shō, called u (derived from the Chinese yu), is not widely used, although some performers, such as Hiromi Yoshida and Ko Ishikawa, began to revive it in the late 20th century.

== Materials and construction ==
The shō consists of 17 bamboo pipes of varying lengths, traditionally made from thin-walled natural bamboo selected for uniformity and resonance.These pipes are mounted vertically into a cup-shaped wooden wind chamber (fukube), which is often carved from lightweight wood and coated with layers of urushi (Japanese lacquer) for airtightness and durability.

Each sounding pipe is fitted with a free metal reed, typically made from a copper-based alloy and coated with lacquer. The reeds are secured using a heated mixture of beeswax and pine resin, creating an airtight and adjustable seal.

A silver or silver-plated mouthpiece is attached to the side of the wind chamber, and a decorative metal ring holds the bamboo pipes in place. Of the 17 pipes, 15 produce sound, while 2 remain silent, retained for symmetry and symbolic representation of the phoenix's wings.

== Crafting and tuning process ==
Shō construction is carried out by highly specialized artisans using traditional handcrafting techniques. Each reed is individually fitted into the bamboo pipe with a pliable wax-resin mixture, and proper alignment is crucial to allow the reed to vibrate freely during inhalation and exhalation.

Tuning is achieved by applying small amounts of a dense wax-lead mixture directly onto the reed, adjusting pitch by altering the reed's mass. Makers test each pipe's tone and carefully scrape or add tuning material until it produces the desired note, allowing for precise micro-adjustments.

== In contemporary music ==
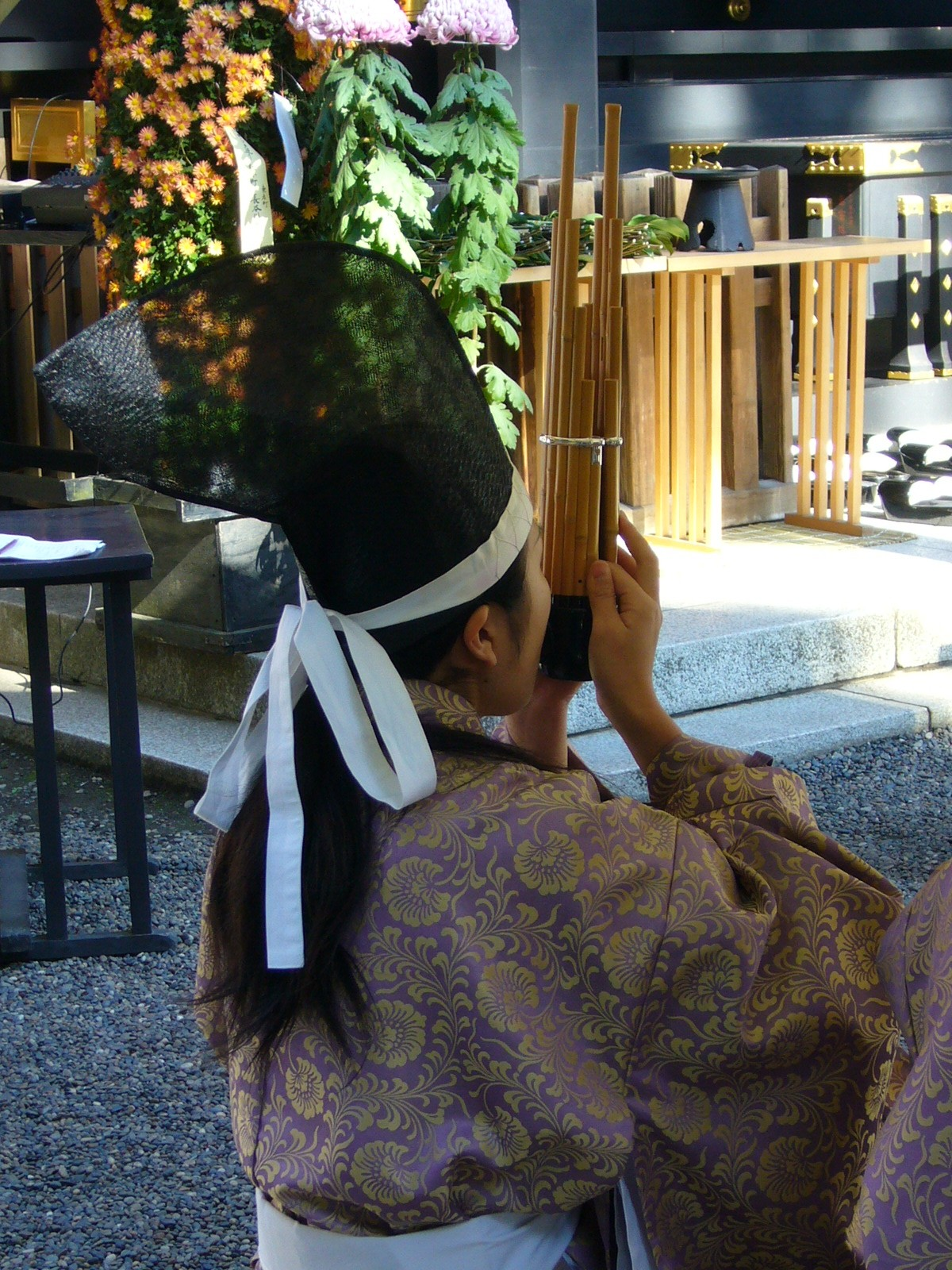
A woman playing the shō

The shō was first used as a solo instrument for contemporary music by the Japanese performer Mayumi Miyata. Miyata and other shō players who specialize in contemporary music use specially constructed instruments whose silent pipes are replaced by pipes that sound notes unavailable on the more traditional instrument, giving a wider range of pitches.

Beginning in the mid-20th century, a number of Japanese composers have created works for the instrument, both solo and in combination with other Japanese and Western instruments. Most prominent among these are Toshi Ichiyanagi, Toru Takemitsu, Takashi Yoshimatsu, Jo Kondo, Maki Ishii, Joji Yuasa, Toshio Hosokawa, and Minoru Miki.

The American composer John Cage (1912–1992) created several Number Pieces for Miyata just before his death, after having met her during the 1990 Darmstadt summer course. Other notable contemporary performers, many of whom also compose for the shō and other instruments, include Hideaki Bunno (Japan), Tamami Tono (Japan), Hiromi Yoshida (Japan), Kō Ishikawa (Japan), Remi Miura (Japan), Naoyuki Manabe (Japan), Naomi Sato (The Netherlands), Alessandra Urso (United States), Randy Raine-Reusch (Canada), and Sarah Peebles (Canada). Peebles has extensively incorporated shō in improvised, composed and electroacoustic contexts, including an album of music with photo essay dedicated to the instrument ("Delicate Paths–Music for Shō", Unsounds 2014). Other notable 20th-century composers who also studied the instrument in Japan include Benjamin Britten and Alan Hovhaness, the latter of whom composed two works for the instrument. German avant-garde composer Helmut Lachenmann used the shō at the climax of his opera, Das Mädchen mit den Schwefelhölzern. Otomo Yoshihide, a Japanese experimental improv musician, incorporates the shō in some of his music.

The instrument was introduced to a wider audience by the German musician Stephan Micus (in his albums Implosions, Life, and Ocean) and the Icelandic singer-songwriter Björk, who used it as the primary instrument in three songs performed by Miyata for the soundtrack album to Drawing Restraint 9, a film by her former boyfriend Matthew Barney, about Japanese culture and whaling. Composer Vache Sharafyan (1966, Armenia) used shō in his composition "My Lofty Moon" scored for five eastern and eight western instruments that was premiered by the Atlas Ensemble in Amsterdam's Muziekgebouw aan 't IJ in 2007.

It was played on the ISS by Koichi Wakata.

== See also ==
- Sheng (instrument)
- Saenghwang
