= Dynamite (Stina Nordenstam album) =

Studio album by Stina Nordenstam
- Released: 13 September 1996
- Genre: Indie rock; slowcore; sadcore; post-rock; dream pop
- Length: 45:01
- Label: Telegram Records Stockholm
- Producer: Manne von Ahn Öberg; Stina Nordenstam

Stina Nordenstam chronology
And She Closed Her Eyes (1994)	Dynamite (1996)	People Are Strange (1998)

Professional ratings
Review scores
Source	Rating
AllMusic	2/5 stars

Dynamite is the third studio album by Swedish singer-songwriter Stina Nordenstam. It was originally released by Telegram Records Stockholm in 1996.

== Track listing ==
All tracks are written by Stina Nordenstam.

No.	Title	Length
1.	"Under Your Command"	5:19
2.	"Dynamite"	4:25
3.	"Almost a Smile"	4:53
4.	"Mary Bell"	4:54
5.	"The Man with the Gun"	4:12
6.	"Until"	3:41
7.	"This Time, John"	3:25
8.	"CQD"	5:40
9.	"Down Desire Avenue"	5:03
10.	"Now That You're Leaving"	3:29
Total length:		45:01

Reissue edition bonus track
No.	Title	Length
11.	"Dynamite (Soundtrack Mix)"	3:31
Total length:		48:32

Japanese edition bonus track
No.	Title	Length
11.	"Greetings from the Old World"	5:19
Total length:		50:20

== Personnel ==
Credits adapted from liner notes.

- Stina Nordenstam – vocals, guitar
- Johan Dereborn – guitar
- Anders Lövgren – guitar
- Thomas Tjärnqvist – guitar
- Jonas Sjöblom – flute, drums, percussion
- Jacob Ruthberg – violin, viola
- Fredrik Burstedt – violin
- Martin Stensson – violin
- Magnus Ekenborn – cello
- Anna Wallgren – cello
- Emelie Gemzel – flute
- Henrik Hilsson – horn
- Johan Soderlund – clarinet
- Jesper Harrysson – oboe
- Morten Östergaard – bassoon

== Charts ==
Chart	Peak position
Swedish Albums (Sverigetopplistan)	17
