= Treaty of Uxbridge =

English Civil War negotiation

The Treaty of Uxbridge was a significant but abortive negotiation in early 1645 to try to end the First English Civil War. In November 1644, the Parliament of England presented its terms for a peace treaty to Charles I of England. The conditions were very assertive, with Presbyterianism to be established south of the Anglo-Scottish border, and Parliament to take control of all military matters.

Charles I was under the impression that the military situation was turning in his favour, due to a series of Royalist (Cavalier) victories and due to an ongoing military campaign under James Graham, 1st Marquess of Montrose in Scotland. Montrose's victory at the Battle of Inverlochy (1645) took place during the conference. Charles I's incentive to compromise was thereby reduced. Meanwhile, the Parliamentarians were also losing interest in the peace negotiations due to their growing confidence in the New Model Army.

== Background ==
Parliament drew up 27 articles in November 1644 and presented them to Charles I of England at Oxford. Much input into these Propositions of Uxbridge was from Archibald Johnston. The conditions were very assertive, with Presbyterianism to be established south of the Anglo-Scottish border, and Parliament to take control of all military matters.

Charles had decided that the military situation was turning in his favour, after the Second Battle of Lostwithiel, Second Battle of Newbury and consequent relief of Donnington Castle, and the campaign of James Graham, 1st Marquess of Montrose in Scotland. Montrose's victory at the Battle of Inverlochy was during the conference. His incentive to compromise was thereby reduced, but the same was true of the Parliamentary side, with its growing confidence in the New Model Army.

== Proposals ==
Samuel Rawson Gardiner (1829–1902) summarized Parliament's demands (formatting added):

1. exclusion from seats in the House of Lords of Peers created [after May 1642] unless with the consent of Parliament (§ 19)
2. permanent submission of appointments of officers and judges to the approbation of Parliament (§ 20)
3. education and marriage of the King's children being placed under Parliamentary control (§ 21)
4. the right of declaring peace and war might only be exercised with the assent of Parliament (§ 23)
5. a permanent body of Commissioners ... in combination with ... Scottish Commissioners to control all military forces in both kingdoms (§ 17)
6. long lists ... of the names of those Royalists who were to be subjected to divers penalties [including execution for treason], and whole categories of unnamed persons were added, the [Parliamentary] expenses of the war being laid upon these Royalist delinquents (§ 14)
7. religion in England ... to be brought to the nearest possible uniformity with that of Scotland (§ 5)
8. the King himself was to swear and sign the Solemn League and Covenant (§ 2)

Such demands can only have been made with the object of trampling upon the King's feelings as well as upon his political authority, and it would have been far more reasonable to ask his consent to an act of abdication than to such articles as these. Charles's counter-demands of January 21, 1645 (No. 62, p. 286), are conceived in a far more reasonable spirit:

1. the Constitution should be accepted as it had stood at the end of August, 1641
2. the Common Prayer Book should be preserved from 'scorn and violence,'
3. a Bill should 'be framed for the ease of tender consciences.' [i.e., religious tolerance (for Protestants)]

The King's offer afforded at least an admirable basis for negotiation.

== Proceedings ==
The two sides lodged in Uxbridge, the Royalists on the south side and the Parliamentarians in the north. Christopher Love preached a sermon, strongly against the Royalists, and he was rebuked by Parliament. The meetings were arranged in the house of Sir John Bennet.

The negotiations, which proved fruitless, went on from 29 January to 22 February. The King offered only to rein in the powers of the episcopate in religious matters, and to give Parliament some control of the militia, limited to a time period of three years.

== Attendance ==
=== Royalists ===
- John Ashburnham
- Sir Orlando Bridgeman
- Lord Arthur Capel
- Lord John Colepeper
- Sir Thomas Gardiner
- Henry Hammond (chaplain)
- Lord Christopher Hatton
- Edward Hyde, Chancellor of the Exchequer
- Richard Lane, Lord Chief Baron
- Francis Leigh, Earl of Chichester
- Edward Nicholas, Secretary of State
- Jeoffry Palmer
- Henry Pierrepont, Earl of Kingston
- Lord Francis Seymour (brother of Hertford)
- William Seymour, Marquess of Hertford
- Gilbert Sheldon
- James Stewart, Duke of Richmond (commission leader)
- Dr. Richard Steward (religion only)
- Thomas Wriothesley, Earl of Southampton

=== Parliamentarians ===
- John Crew
- Erasmus Earle (secretary)
- Basil Feilding, Earl of Denbigh
- Nathaniel Hardy
- Philip Herbert, Earl of Pembroke
- Denzil Holles
- Stephen Marshall
- Algernon Percy, Earl of Northumberland (commission leader)
- William Pierrepont (brother of Kingston)
- Edmund Prideaux
- William Cecil, Earl of Salisbury
- Oliver St John
- John Thurloe (secretary)
- Sir Henry Vane the Younger
- Richard Vines
- Lord Thomas Wenman
- Bulstrode Whitelocke

=== Scottish ===
- Robert Barclay
- Lord John Bolmerino
- Archibald Campbell, Marquess of Argile
- John Campbell, Lord Chancellor of Scotland (commission leader)
- Mr. Cheesly (secretary)
- George Dundas
- Charles Erskins
- Alexander Henderson (religion only)
- Sir Archibald Johnston
- Hugh Kennedy
- Lord John Maitland
- Sir John Smith

== See also ==
- Crown and Treaty
