= Twice Born Men =

Studio album by Sweet Billy Pilgrim
- Released: 23 March 2009
- Genre: Alternative rock
- Label: Samadhi Sound
- Producer: Tim Elsenburg

Sweet Billy Pilgrim chronology
We Just Did What Happened and No One Came (2005)	Twice Born Men (2009)	Crown and Treaty (2012)

Twice Born Men is an album by English experimental rock band Sweet Billy Pilgrim. It was shortlisted for the 2009 Mercury Prize, and the Sunday Times named it one of their top 100 albums of 2009.

== Track listing ==
1. "Here It Begins" (2:36)
2. "Truth Only Smiles" (5:05)
3. "Bloodless Coup" (5:43)
4. "Longshore Drift" (5:01)
5. "Kalypso" (6:30)
6. "Future Perfect Tense" (4:31)
7. "Joy Maker Machinery" (6:55)
8. "There Will It End" (4:40)

== Personnel ==
- Anthony Bishop - banjo, bass
- Tim Elsenburg - singing, guitar, producer, mixing
- Alistair Hamer - sequencing, drums
- David Sylvian - artwork [Art Direction]
- Chris Bigg - artwork [Design]
- Tacita Dean - artwork [Drawings]
- Alphonse Elsenburg - clarinet (track 2, 8)
