= Drawing Restraint 9 (album) =

The Music from Matthew Barney's Drawing Restraint 9

Soundtrack album by Björk
- Released: 25 July 2005
- Recorded: 2004
- Length: 52:03
- Label: One Little Indian
- Producers: Björk; Mark Bell; Valgeir Sigurðsson

Björk chronology
Army of Me: Remixes and Covers (2005)	The Music from Matthew Barney's Drawing Restraint 9 (2005)	Surrounded (2006)

Professional ratings
Aggregate scores
Source	Rating
Metacritic	67/100
Review scores
Source	Rating
AllMusic	4/5 stars
Entertainment Weekly	B
The Guardian	4/5 stars
Mojo	3/5 stars
Pitchfork	7.0/10
Rolling Stone	3/5 stars
Spin	2/5 stars
Stylus	B+
Tiny Mix Tapes	4/5 stars
Uncut	8/10

The Music from Matthew Barney's Drawing Restraint 9 is the second soundtrack album by Björk, released on 25 July 2005 in the United Kingdom and on 23 August 2005 in the United States. It was composed for Matthew Barney's Drawing Restraint 9, which Björk co-starred in as an "Occidental Guest", acting as the ninth installment of his ongoing Drawing Restraint film series.

The album was re-released in 2006 as a DualDisc including new DTS 96/24 5.1-channel surround sound mixes on the DVD-audio side, plus the extra track "Petrolatum". The DualDisc also formed part of the Surrounded box set.

== Background ==
For the composing of the soundtrack, Björk traveled to Japan to study ancient Japanese music. Several tracks are made with the sound of the shō, a Japanese instrument which contains 16 various reeds; Mayumi Miyata plays the shō on multiple compositions in the soundtrack and appears in the film playing the instrument. "Holographic Entrypoint" features a Noh score and vocal performance by Shiro Nomura, which complements a climactic scene in the film.

Alternative folk singer Will Oldham (also known as Bonnie 'Prince' Billy) is featured on the first track, "Gratitude", singing a letter from a Japanese fisherman to General Douglas MacArthur set to a melody by Matthew Barney. Björk brought "Nameless" back from her 2003 tour, and, with the help of Leila Arab, looped and edited it to create the track "Storm". Björk's vocals feature only on the tracks "Bath", "Storm", and "Cetacea". "Gratitude", "Shimenawa" and "Cetacea" feature harp player Zeena Parkins, who previously collaborated with Björk on her 2001 album Vespertine. "Hunter Vessel" was later sampled on her album Volta for the tracks "Vertebræ by Vertebræ" and "Declare Independence". The track "Storm" was featured in the 2012 video game Spec Ops: The Line.

== Track listing ==
All tracks written by Björk, except where noted. All tracks produced solely by Björk, except for "Ambergris March" produced with Mark Bell and Valgeir Sigurðsson.

Drawing Restraint 9
No.	Title	Writer(s)	Length
1.	"Gratitude"	Barney, Björk	5:00
2.	"Pearl"		3:43
3.	"Ambergris March"		4:04
4.	"Bath"	Björk, Akira Rabelais	5:14
5.	"Hunter Vessel"		6:43
6.	"Shimenawa"		2:55
7.	"Vessel Shimenawa"		2:01
8.	"Storm"	Björk, Leila	5:38
9.	"Holographic Entrypoint"	Barney	10:04
10.	"Cetacea"	Barney, Björk	3:17
11.	"Antarctic Return"		4:23

=== The film ===
The following is a list of the full score used in the film ordered from when they chronologically appear. Many of the tracks are instrumental or variations of the main themes so were not included on the official soundtrack.

1. "Gratitude" (Barney, Björk) – 4:59
2. "Petrolatum" – 6:10
3. "Haf"
4. "Pearl" – 3:43
5. "Nisshin Maru" (Valgeir Sigurðsson) – 2:41
6. "Host" (Mark Bell) – 5:50
7. "Bath" (Björk, Akira Rabelais) – 5:07
8. "Aposiopesis" (Akira Rabelais) – 5:16
9. "Hunter Vessel" – 6:36
10. "Shimenawa" – 2:48
11. "Vessel Shimenawa" – 1:54
12. "Repose" (Valgeir Sigurðsson) – 8:49
13. "Storm" (Björk, Leila) – 5:32
14. "Holographic Entrypoint" (Barney) – 9:57
15. "Ambergris March" – 3:57
16. "Field Inversion" – 1:00
17. "Cetacea" (Barney, Björk) – 3:12
18. "Antarctic Return" – 4:18

== Personnel ==
- Björk – arranger, producer, programmer, keyboards, harp, beat programming
- Tanya Tagaq – throat singing
- Luis "Kako" Alvarez – design assistant
- Yuji Arai – coordination, session coordinator
- Matthew Barney – director, producer, writer, design, direction, filmmaker
- Scott Bartucca – oboe
- Mark Bell – producer, beat programming
- David Bobroff – contrabass trombone
- James Button – oboe
- Bruce Eidem – trombone
- Emil Friðfinnsson – horn
- Christopher Gaudi – oboe
- Barbara Gladstone – producer
- Kathy Halvorson – oboe
- Shinichi Ishikawa – liner notes
- Clarice Jensen – assistant, project coordinator
- Mai Kamio – chorus
- Alisa Kikuchi – chorus
- Alexandra Knoll – oboe
- Winnie Lai – oboe
- Dan "D Unit" Levine – trombone
- Dan Levine – trombone
- Eleanor Miceli – chorus
- Taro Miceli – chorus
- Mayumi Miyata – sho
- Umeda Miyuki – assistant engineer
- Tony Morgan – design
- Nico Muhly – conductor, keyboards, preparation, score preparation
- Shiro Nomura – vocals
- Shonosuke Okura – percussion, chant
- Will Oldham – vocals
- Guðrún Óskarsdóttir – harpsichord
- Eiríkur Örn Pálsson – trumpet
- Zeena Parkins – harp
- Dean Plank – trombone
- Sigurður S. Porbergsson – trombone
- Sturla Pórisson – assistant engineer
- Akira Rabelais – piano treatments
- Matt Ryle – production design
- Einar St. Jónsson – trumpet
- Christopher Seguine – post production supervisor, post producer
- Jónas Sen – celeste
- Shogo Senda – chorus
- Raku Shigematsu – chorus
- Valgeir Sigurðsson – keyboards, programming, producer, engineer, mixing, beat programming
- Samuel Solomon – percussion, glockenspiel, crotale
- Peter Strietmann – photography, photography director
- Henry Takizawa – chorus
- Merrill Takizawa – chorus
- Takahiro Uchida – engineer
- Kuniyoshi Ueda – noh arranger, translation
- Marcus Grandon – assistance to Mr. Ueda
- Paul P Dub Walton – mixing
- Chris Washburn – trombone
- Tommy Webster – assistant engineer
- Chris Winget – photography

== Charts ==
Chart (2005)	Peak position
Belgian Albums (Ultratop Wallonia)	51
French Albums (SNEP)	67
Italian Albums (FIMI)	39
Spanish Albums (Promusicae)	74
UK Albums (Official Charts)	141
UK Soundtrack Albums (OCC)	2
