= Crown and Treaty (album) =

Studio album by Sweet Billy Pilgrim
- Released: 30 April 2012
- Genre: Alternative rock
- Label: Luxor Purchase
- Producer: Tim Elsenburg

Sweet Billy Pilgrim chronology
Twice Born Men (2009)	Crown and Treaty (2012)	Motorcade Amnesiacs (2015)

Crown and Treaty is an album by English band Sweet Billy Pilgrim. It is the follow-up album to Twice Born Men, a Mercury Music Prize album of the year 2009. It is named after the Crown and Treaty pub in Uxbridge, London.

== Reception ==
Professional ratings
Aggregate scores
Source	Rating
Metacritic	88/100
Review scores
Source	Rating
AllMusic	3.5/5 stars
The Arts Desk	4/5 stars
Consequence of Sound	4/5 stars
Evening Standard	4/5 stars
The Independent	4/5 stars
Mojo	5/5 stars
musicOMH	4.5/5 stars
The Observer	4/5 stars
Q	4/5 stars
Uncut	8/10

Crown and Treaty received positive reviews upon release. On Metacritic, the album holds a score of 88/100 based on 8 reviews, indicating "universal acclaim".

== Track listing ==
1. "Joyful Reunion"
2. "Archaeology"
3. "Blakefield Gold"
4. "Arrived at Upside Down"
5. "Blood Is Big Expense"
6. "Brugada"
7. "Kracklite"
8. "Shadow Captain"
9. "Blue Sky Falls"

== Personnel ==
- Anthony Bishop – bass
- Jana Carpenter – vocals
- Alistair Hamer – drums
- Tim Elsenburg – vocals, guitar, producer, mixing
