= Drawing Restraint 9 =

- Theatrical release poster
- Directed by: Matthew Barney
- Written by: Matthew Barney
- Produced by: Mike Bellon; Barbara Gladstone
- Starring: Matthew Barney; Björk; Mayumi Miyata; Shiro Nomura; Tomoyuki Ogawa; Sosui Oshima
- Cinematography: Peter Strietmann
- Edited by: Luis Alvarez y Alvarez; Matthew Barney; Christopher Seguine; Peter Strietmann
- Music by: Björk; Akira Rabelais; Valgeir Sigurðsson
- Production company: Restraint LLC
- Distributed by: IFC Films
- Release dates: July 1, 2005 (Japan); March 24, 2006 (United States)
- Running time: 135 minutes
- Countries: United States; Japan
- Languages: English; Japanese; Icelandic
- Box office: $267,275

Drawing Restraint 9 is a 2005 experimental art film written and directed by visual artist Matthew Barney consisting of a feature-length film, large-scale sculptures, photographs, drawings, and books. The Drawing Restraint series consists of 19 numbered components and related materials. Some episodes are videos, others sculptural installations or drawings. Barney created Drawing Restraint 1-6 while still an undergraduate at Yale University and completed Drawing Restraint 16 in 2007 at London's Serpentine Gallery. With a soundtrack composed by Björk, Drawing Restraint 9 is an unconventional love story set in Japan. The narrative structure is built upon themes such as the Shinto religion, the tea ceremony, the history of whaling, and the supplantation of blubber with refined petroleum for oil.

The film primarily takes place aboard the Japanese factory whaling vessel, the Nisshin Maru, in the Sea of Japan, as it makes its annual journey to Antarctica. Two storylines occur simultaneously on the vessel: one on deck and one beneath. The narrative on deck involves the process of casting a 25-ton petroleum jelly sculpture (one of Barney’s signature materials), which rivals the scale of a whale. Below deck, the two main characters participate as guests in a tea ceremony, where they are formally engaged after arriving on the ship as strangers. As the film progresses, the guests go through an emotional and physical transformation slowly transfiguring from land mammals into sea mammals, as they fall in love. The petroleum jelly sculpture simultaneously passes through changing states, from warm to cool, and from the architectural back to the primordial. The dual narratives, the sculptural and the romantic, come to reflect one another until the climactic point at which they become completely mutual.

Drawing Restraint 9 premiered at the 62nd Venice Film Festival and was screened at the Toronto International Film Festival in September 2005. IFC Films acquired the U.S. theatrical rights to Drawing Restraint 9 and distributed the film to screen in 18 cities across the U.S. in the fall of 2006. It grossed over $267K at the box office.

== Narrative and imagery ==
The film opens with the careful, ceremonial wrapping of two unidentifiable organic objects in several layers of carefully folded decorative paper, an activity known in Japanese as tsutsumi or orikata, sealed with twine and gold field emblems and finished with a sliver of white shell. The centre strips of the field emblems, a recurring symbol in Barney's works, are then pulled off, a frequently repeated motif throughout the film. The scene moves to Nagasaki bay where a celebratory procession of dancers, animals and floats approaches the docks as the crew of the whaling ship finish construction on the shore.

After the opening credits, a field emblem mould is assembled on the deck of the Nisshin Maru and filled with molten petroleum jelly from one of the vehicles in the celebratory procession. One of the 'Occidental Guests', played by Björk, waits on another shore with her gaze directed out to sea. The other Occidental Guest, Matthew Barney, waits on a docking rig in a large fur coat. In a third location a group of young women at the water's edge, pearl divers, apply grease to each other's skin in preparation for the dive. Separately, the Occidental Guests are picked up by small motorised vessels and carried towards the Nisshin Maru. The pearl divers enter the water with their collection barrels, hyperventilate to improve their lung capacity and make the first dive. Mayumi Miyata is shown playing the shō over the scene with a string of pearls entwined in her hair and hanging down her exposed back.

The pearl divers come across a long, floating mass of compacted organic material, a sculpture from Barney's repertoire titled and here representing ambergris, an extremely valuable organic material produced as waste by whales. Whilst they keenly examine it, the Nisshin Maru leaves dock in a festive cloud of coloured ribbons and excited, screaming children. In the ship's galley, the chef cleans his knives and utensils, boils shrimp and cuts blocks of grey, layered jelly into plated portions using a field emblem mould. The central strip of the top layer of each field emblem is incised in order to allow the ship's crew, to whom the jelly is served, to pull it away. The chef goes through the ship's mess, filling each central void with shrimp and pomegranate seeds.

The Female Guest bathes in preparation for the tea ceremony

As the small vessels ferrying the Occidental Guests pull up to the ship, an activity on deck is shown in which a man with two large stamps, in the style of a Japanese calligraphic seal, repetitively and rhythmically inks the instruments and imprints large rectangles of canvas. The Female Guest is led to descending stairs in the deck. She looks out over the prow of the vessel and finds her way down into the labyrinthine bowels of the ship. Occasionally she comes across small rocks on the corridor floor wrapped with red twine, which she appears to intuitively interpret as warning markers to prevent her from losing her way. Her path eventually takes her to a room with a large, metal, cubic bath where two Japanese women in blue serving garb, amah, attend to her. They pour a basket of lemons that have had a central strip excised into the water and remove the Guest's clothing before she steps into the bath. The Male Guest is lifted to the ship's deck in a large, winched basket and led to the same descending stairs. He searches for the correct door and arrives at the ship's barber, who carefully shaves off the entirety of Guest's substantial beard with a straight-razor. The petroleum jelly in the field-mould starts to solidify on deck. The Male Guest, shorn and dressed in denim, is guided by twine-wrapped rocks to a room separated by a large antique screen on which a traditional fishing scene is painted.

In the whaling bay the crew, bantering in Japanese, 'harpoon' a mock whale made from a black bin bag painted with the stylised features of a whale and stuffed with whole shrimp that burst out of the ruptured plastic after a direct hit from a crewman. A building component, reminiscent of a spine and covered with the debris of the shrimp, is victoriously hoisted aloft on a harpoon. In the screened room the Male Guest takes off his shoes and falls asleep. The barber, carrying his shaving kit and swigging from an open can of beer, slips in quietly and shaves a wide strip through the center of the Guest's hair.

The next morning, the harpoon vessel Yushin Maru sets out. It eventually snares the log of ambergris and the Nisshin Maru winches it up into the flensing bay through the back of the ship. Below deck, the Female Guest wanders through the corridors in a thin towel following her bath. She is encouraged to sit before a mirror in another preparation room by an amah, who carefully combs and arranges her hair into an ornate, traditional style using pieces of organic marine material arranged on combs, pins and boards. Another amah attends to the Male Guest, replacing his shorn eyebrows and hair with similar objects. Both Guests are stripped and redressed in ceremonial costume of skins and furs, with a base layer of damp fabric resembling thick kelp. The female Guest's eyebrows are shaved, her face painted with a thick layer of white foundation, and her lips painted over with the small, red pout of a Shinto bride. Both Guests also carry a large conch shell strapped to their backs, flensing knives with horn handles and a small bone instrument resembling a folded fan. Meanwhile, on deck, the field emblem sculpture has hardened in the mould and the crew use flensing tools and a winch to strip the central piece out of the mould.

The Host conducts the tea ceremony for the Occidental Guests

In awkward bone sandals, both Guests make their way to the traditionally-appointed tea room. They wait together in silence in the ante-chamber, a niche in the corridor, whilst the workers examine the ambergris on deck and the Host prepares his organically-fashioned instruments for the tea ceremony. The sliding door to the tea room is pulled ajar and the two Guests look searchingly at each other to decide how to proceed. The Male Guest kneels at the door first, places his shoes outside the room and enters in the agonisingly slow ritual style of placing his fan one pace ahead to where he will shuffle forward, in his restrictive ceremonial garb, acknowledging the tokonoma alcove before he reaches his place in front of the host. The Female Guest enters and repeats the process. The Host enters and the Guests thank him for his invitation - the Male Guest in English and the Female Guest in Icelandic, the actors' native languages. The tea ceremony is enacted and the Host describes the history of the Nisshin Maru vessel as the crew carve the excised part of the field sculpture into solid blocks and render them in the ship's furnace. The plastic 'spine' from the excised part is lowered into the ship's hold.

The Occidental Guests passionately strip flesh from each other during the storm

As the sun goes down outside, the two Guests shift gradually closer to each other in the empty tea room. On deck the ambergris is anointed with sake and the remainder of the spirit is doled out to the crew. They toast the ambergris with their sake and night falls, bringing a heavy storm.

In the furnace room, the needle on a pressure gauge vibrates towards the end of the scale and the rivets on the machinery give. The ship begins to flood with molten grease. In the infirmary, a small Japanese boy with an extrusion of white fur from his mouth vomits grey liquid. The Female Guest falls as the ship pitches and the Male Guest leans over to help her up and remove her ceremonial hood. The two examine each other, finding strange holes on the back of each other's necks which they lovingly caress. They passionately kiss as the room begins to flood and the storm rages outside. With their flensing knives they alternate cutting deep strips from the flesh of the other's legs at a slow, ritualistic pace with minimal apparent sensation of pain, at one stage rolling such a strip into a rough imitation of sushi and eagerly consuming it. On deck, the ambergris log is inserted between the two halves of the field emblem sculpture into the void left by the excised strip. A troupe of small children wearing white robes carry in a box and set of plastic ritual equipment shaped as whaling tools. They also carry two wooden barrels, one containing shrimps and other a viscuous grey substance. Two of the children proceed to cement the shrimp around the base of the ambergris using the grey substance to bind it. The crew later return to winch the ambergris back out of the sculpture, leaving only the cemented shrimp base. At dawn the mould is then removed from the sculpture, which then collapses into a large pile of congealed petroleum jelly with the assistance of the long-handled flensing knives, and the ambergris is lowered back down into the hold to lie alongside the plastic 'spine' where it begins to disintegrate. The remainder of the field emblem sculpture is dismantled by knives and winches and the ambergris has attained the shape of the plastic spine it lies joined with.

Back in the tea room, the Occidental Guests remove the last of each other's legs by slicing at the thigh. They wearily embrace, then dive beneath the water together. Their severed stumps become the waving tails of whales. A clown-like figure with matted hair and coloured face-paint, identified by Barney as the petrolatum spirit, approaches the ambergris with a hose and raises a new flag on deck. The Occidental Guests complete their metamorphosis into whales.

At the coast, as the Nisshin Maru continues its journey at sea, a winch drags a wedge-shaped block up the sloping bay to the docks. A pearl diver surfaces with her mouth dripping with pearls. The docking slope collapses under the weight of the block and pearls spill into the ocean, landing on the ocean bed in the perfect form of two overlapping circles. The film ends on Mayumi Miyata playing the shō.

== Cast ==
- Matthew Barney as Occidental Guest
- Björk as Occidental Guest
- Mayumi Miyata as Sho Player
- Shiro Nomura
- Tomoyuki Ogawa as Captain
- Sosui Oshima as Host
- Yoshio Harada as Flensing Deck Crew

== Reception ==
Upon release the film received mixed to positive from critics, on Rotten Tomatoes the film has an approval rating of 60% out of 47 critics with an average rating of 5.7/10, the websites critical consensus reads “Some of the images are striking, if confusing, but the film is unbearably slow and tedious.” On Metacritic the film has an average score of 61% based on 20 critics indicating generally favourable reviews.

== Soundtrack ==
The Drawing Restraint 9 soundtrack was composed by Björk and was released on One Little Indian, July 25, 2005. It features the shō (Japanese mouth organ) playing of Mayumi Miyata, who appears playing her instrument near the start and conclusion of the film. Vocals for the opening scenes – featuring the English translation of the text of a letter from a Japanese citizen to General MacArthur thanking him for lifting the U.S. moratorium on whaling off the nation's coasts adapted by Barney and set to the harp (Zeena Parkins) and celeste (Jónas Sen) by Björk – were provided by Will Oldham.

== See also ==
- The Cremaster Cycle
