= Sweet Billy Pilgrim =

English band

- Origin: Aylesbury, England
- Genres: Art rock, progressive rock, folk, folktronica, alternative rock, pop
- Years active: 2003–present
- Labels: Luxor Purchase, Samadhi Sound, Wonderland Avenue, K-Scope, Deco Audio Records.
- Members: Anthony Bishop; Jana Carpenter; Tim Elsenburg; Alistair Hamer
- Website: sweetbillypilgrim.com

Sweet Billy Pilgrim is an English genre spanning band, composed of bassist/banjo player Anthony Bishop, guitarist and singer Jana Carpenter, guitarist and singer Tim Elsenburg, and drummer/percussionist Alistair Hamer. Often described as rock, folk rock, folktronica, Americana, alternative, art rock, electronica, pop or prog, they describe their sound as "thrash pastel".

== Biography ==
The original three members met while at school. Elsenburg and Bishop are from Wingrave and Hamer from Wendover, both near Aylesbury in Buckinghamshire. American born Carpenter joined the band in 2010.

Sweet Billy Pilgrim formed in 2003 after their previous band, Cordisto, came to an end. The band are named after the main character in Kurt Vonnegut's book Slaughterhouse 5.

After repeated rejections from both major and independent record labels, Elsenburg bought a Power Book, they installed Logic, and the band began to record themselves. Due to financial restraints, the early Sweet Billy Pilgrim recordings up until 2012's Crown and Treaty were (apart from the acoustic drums) produced in a garden shed using a laptop and one quite good microphone. The band feel this has had a positive influence on their sound.

Their first release "Experience", was distributed amongst fans and was followed up by the Stars Spill Out of Cups EP. Released on their own label (Luxor Purchase) and featuring hand-stamped artwork, it contains three songs: "Stars Spill Out of Cups", "God in the Details", and "Atlantis". The band also gave away a recording called "Forget to Breathe" as an mp3.

We Just Did What Happened and No One Came was released in 2005 and awarded four stars by Mojo magazine, and The Sunday Times called it "a rather special debut", making the track "Stars Spill Out of Cups" one of their songs of the year.

Twice Born Men was released in 2009 and was awarded five stars by Italian magazine Rockstar and made CD of the Week by The Sunday Times; later that year it made The Sunday Times top 100 albums of 2009 list. The album was also awarded four stars by Mojo and Uncut, and was made a Mercury Prize album of the year for 2009.

Crown and Treaty was released on 30 April 2012. Critical response was positive, with all major UK national papers awarding the record four or five stars out of five. It was awarded five stars and Instant Classic by Mojo and four stars by Q magazine. The majority of the recording for this album took place at Elsenburg's cottage, with the exception of the acoustic drums which were recorded at Earth Terminal studios and the choir which was recorded at Grove Studios. Crown and Treaty was self-released on their own label (Luxor Purchase) much like the early recordings, but distributed through EMI label services.

Besides their work as Sweet Billy Pilgrim, Bishop, Hamer, and Elsenburg have worked together as session musicians, having toured as members of Martin Grech's band during the Open Heart Zoo era, and playing on the Toyah Willcox album Velvet Lined Shell. Carpenter writes for, sings, and performs with folk band Piefinger.

Bishop currently plays electric bass in The Boy Least Likely To's touring band, and his playing is featured on both of the band's albums. Hamer toured with The Boy Least Likely To until 2008, and his drumming is featured on the James Dean Bradfield album The Great Western. Elsenburg has recorded and performed with Steve Jansen, recorded with Adem Ilhan, remixed for David Sylvian and Steve Adey, and written with Toyah Willcox.

Due to the complexity and layering of sounds used on the recordings, recreating the songs live requires the members to play many different instruments on stage. Bishop plays electric bass, banjo, and vocals. Carpenter plays acoustic guitar, cymbals, samples, keyboards and vocals. Elsenburg plays guitar, keyboards, harmonica, and vocals. Hamer plays drums (usually a Yamaha Rock Tour Custom), samples, and vocals. They are typically joined live by musician Dan Garland playing piano, keyboards, samples, vocals, and square waves, Barney Muller on electric guitar and backing vocals; and sometimes by Adam Chetwood (I Am Arrows) playing acoustic guitar, electric guitar and banjo.

On 9 July 2010, Sweet Billy Pilgrim appeared as themselves in series four, episode three ("Something Happened") of The IT Crowd. The band performed with fictional keyboardist Norman, who Jen dated until he was kicked out of the band. On 13 July 2010, their song "Future Perfect Tense" was made available as a download for the game Rock Band 2. In August 2010, they recruited Jana Carpenter and started recording their third studio album.

In April 2013, in collaboration with Mojo magazine the band gave away a free download of Crown and Treaty with the full artwork in exchange for signing up to their mailing list.

In March 2014, they began recording their fourth studio album. In March 2015, it was announced that the band had signed to Kscope, and that they would be releasing the new album – Motorcade Amnesiacs – on 25 May 2015. The first single from the album, "Coloma Blues", was premiered at the same time as the album announcement. The band also launched a release campaign for Motorcade Amnesiacs on direct-to-fan platform PledgeMusic.

In April 2015, the band revealed the video for their new single "Just Above Midtown".

== Discography ==
=== Albums ===
- We Just Did What Happened and No One Came – Wonderland Avenue (2005)
- Twice Born Men – Samadhi Sound (2009)
- Crown and Treaty – Luxor Purchase (2012)
- Motorcade Amnesiacs – Kscope (2015)
- Wapentak – Deco Audio Records (2018)
- Somapolis – Chrow Records (2022)

=== EPs ===
- Stars Spill Out of Cups EP – Luxor Purchase (2004)
- Brugada EP – Spoilt Victorian Child (2005)

=== Singles ===
- "Experience" – Luxor Purchase (2004)
- "Forget to Breathe" – Luxor Purchase (2005) (Free .mp3 download)
- "Future Perfect Tense" b/w "Kalypso" (featuring Jen from the IT Crowd) – Samadhi Sound (2010)
- "Coloma Blues" – Kscope (2015)
- "Just Above Midtown" – Kscope (2015)
