= Akira Rabelais =

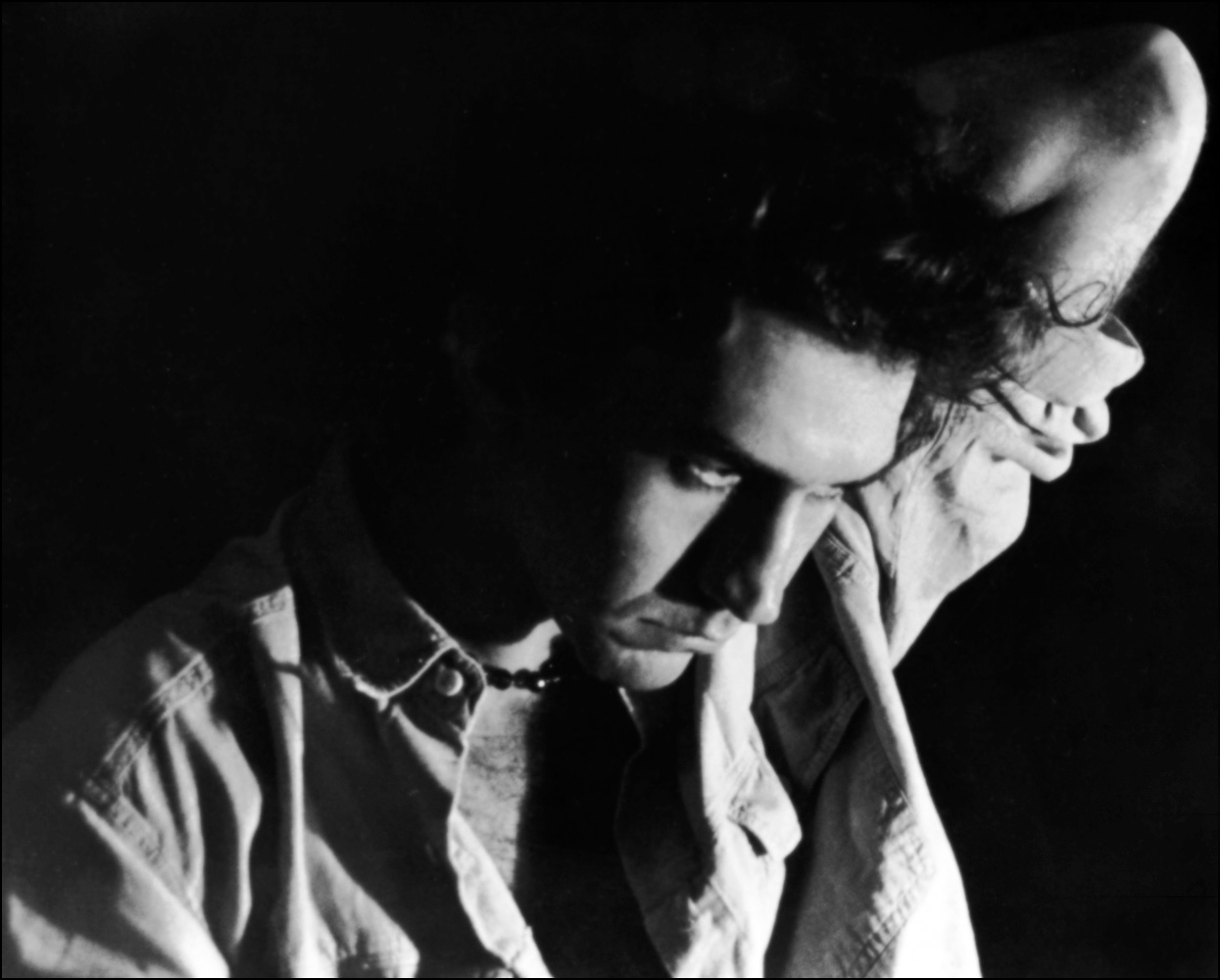
- Akira Rabelais, 1997

Background information
- Born: Vincent Akira Rabelais Carté; March 28, 1966 (age 60); South Texas, U.S.
- Genres: Electroacoustic; computer music; ambient; classical
- Instruments: Computer, piano
- Years active: 1997–present
- Labels: Samadhi Sound; Ritornell
- Website: akirarabelais.com

Akira Rabelais is an American electronic composer, poet, and software developer known for his work in experimental music and digital multimedia art. His compositions often involve the transformation of preexisting material through algorithmic and time domain-based processes.

He is the creator of the software suite Argeïphontes Lyre, a system for the recombination and manipulation of audio and other media that has been used by experimental musicians and discussed in both critical and academic contexts. Rabelais' 2004 album Spellewauerynsherde, released on Samadhi Sound, received critical attention for its use of processed archival recordings, including Icelandic lamentations.

== Career and artistry ==
Rabelais began his career on the record label Ritornell, until in 2004 when David Sylvian signed him to his record label Samadhi Sound. In 2004, Rabelais released his now cult classic record Spellewauerynsherde to critical acclaim on the label. The record reportedly samples traditional Icelandic a cappella lament songs. Writing for All About Jazz, Nenad Georgievski described Spellewauerynsherde as "a remarkable and challenging work," noting its extensive transformation of preexisting vocal material; reviews in Paris Transatlantic emphasized the album's combination of historical source material and contemporary digital processing, highlighting its “strange and compelling beauty” and its departure from conventional compositional approaches. It was reissued on multiple vinyl editions by Boomkat Editions in 2017.

Rabelais' work has also been discussed in the context of experimental digital practices and "sound hacking," with academic writing situating his software Argeïphontes Lyre within a broader tradition of artist-developed tools for the manipulation and recombination of audio.

Rabelais was enlisted by Björk to collaborate on the piece "Bath" for Matthew Barney's 2005 film Drawing Restraint 9, which Björk co-starred in as an "Occidental Guest", acting as the ninth installment of his Drawing Restraint film series. More recent projects, including his work based on Marcel Proust's À la recherche du temps perdu, have been noted for extending these methods into large-scale literary and multimedia contexts.

=== Argeïphontes Lyre ===
Argeïphontes Lyre is an experimental software suite developed by Akira Rabelais for the transformation and generation of audio, image, and text. The system consists of a collection of creative filters and generative processes designed to recombine and alter source material through algorithmic operations. Its methods include recombination, mutation, distortion, and the application of mathematical structures; for audio, time domain-based processes are emphasized. The first version of the software originated as Rabelais' graduate thesis at the California Institute of the Arts in 1997.

Argeïphontes Lyre has been used by experimental musicians and sound artists including Terre Thaemlitz, Biosphere, and Scanner. Rabelais has used the software extensively in his own compositions. The software is distributed as freeware and has been discussed in the context of experimental digital sound practices and “sound hacking” in academic literature.

== Discography ==
Studio albums

- Elongated Pentagonal Pyramid (1999, Ritornell)
- Eisoptrophobia (2001, Ritornell)
- ...Bénédiction, Draw. (2003, Ortholorng Musork)
- Spellewauerynsherde (2004, Samadhi Sound)
- A.M. Station (2005, En/Of)
- Hollywood (2008, Schoolmap)
- Caduceus (2010, Samadhi Sound)
- The Little Glass (2015, self-released)
- cxvi (2019, Boomkat Editions)
- Context in the Moment (2020, Boomkat Editions)
- À la recherche du temps perdu (2021, self-released)
- 図書館 (2021, self-released)

Collaborations

- "Bath", with Björk, The Music from Matthew Barney's Drawing Restraint 9 (2005, One Little Indian); incorporates "Aposiopesis" from Eisoptrophobia
