= Blemish (album) =

Studio album by David Sylvian
- Released: May 2003
- Recorded: February–March 2003
- Studios: Samadhi Sound Studio, New Hampshire
- Genres: Ambient; experimental; electronic; avant-garde
- Length: 43:41
- Label: Samadhisound
- Producer: David Sylvian

David Sylvian chronology
| Camphor (2002) | Blemish (2003) | The Good Son vs. The Only Daughter (The Blemish Remixes) (2005) |

Blemish is the sixth studio album by British singer-songwriter David Sylvian, released in May 2003 on Sylvian's Samadhisound label.

Following his release from his contract with Virgin Records, Sylvian built a home studio, Samadhi Sound Studio, where he recorded Blemish in early 2003. The album was inspired by, and documents, the disintegration of Sylvian's relationship with his wife, Ingrid Chavez, marking a turning point in Sylvian's lyrics as they became more personal and open and less oblique. Wanting to find a new musical vocabulary for himself, he recorded the album in a relatively quick, six-week duration, improvising the eight songs on the album as he went. It features guest appearances from free improvisation guitarist Derek Bailey and electronic musician Fennesz.

The album is experimental in its use of electronics and sound and marks a stark departure in Sylvian's musical career, moving in an ambient direction and featuring fewer occurrences of melody. Sylvian felt the album functioned as catharsis, and that recording the album helped him work through difficult emotions. Blemish was originally released via the internet only, but when the album caught the attention of distributors, Sylvian set up Samadhi Sound records who released the album commercially in mid-2003. Despite alienating several fans, Blemish was a critical success, with praise given to its dark, personal tone. Sylvian toured in promotion of the album in autumn 2003, while a remix album entitled The Good Son vs. The Only Daughter, containing remixes of each of the songs from Blemish remixed by international producers, was released in February 2005.

== Background and inspiration ==
Blemish follows David Sylvian's protracted legal wranglings with Virgin Records, which ended when Sylvian was released from his contract. During his later days on the label, Sylvian was seen as "a historical oddity" on their roster as opposed to "a sound business investment," seeing as he had a developed cult following but had very limited commercial success. Although the musician was preparing compilation albums of his work for Virgin, he found it a creatively stifling process, but despite wishing to "start over again" had no support from the label. He felt the industry would not be supportive of the work he wanted to create, and upon leaving Virgin, become more self-sufficient, building a home studio in his New Hampshire home, Samadhi Sound Studio, over the course of a year. Blemish, recorded without a contract, became the first of several ongoing projects from Sylvian after leaving the label.

Blemish also documents the disintegration of Sylvian's relationship with his wife, American singer Ingrid Chavez. Sylvian used Blemish to channel his emotions "as a kind of creative catharsis", in the words of Flux magazine, using his unhappiness to "delve deeper into some of the darker corners of his consciousness. Once you are down, you may as well keep drilling and see how far you can go and use the experience to exorcise some hidden demons." Sylvian said that he had a "sense of trauma" that needed addressing and "wanted out," adding: "I used the emotions to punch further into the darker recesses of my own mind, to see how far I could go, to see what I would find there and if and how I could give it voice." Sylvian explained to how the album worked as a style of therapy:

"I didn’t know how to handle the emotional side of things. Once I got into the studio and closed the studio door, I felt a certain sense of safety, of liberty, to deal with the emotions, emotions that were primarily negative and all to do with my relationship with my wife. I wanted to delve far deeper into them than I would in daily life. How far can you go with that sort of feeling and where does it lead you? At the same time, I’m delving into something that one should be wary of delving into, because you don’t know how readily you will be able to re-surface from it at the end of the day. There was a sort of trepidation involved."

"It was very cathartic. It's an odd one to talk about, because obviously I was going through a break up of a marriage and that was very painful, but as I got into the studio and shut the door I would allow myself into the darkest recesses of my heart and my mind to uncover what was there. And I would feel that to be quite dangerous in life – it's not something I would encourage – but in the creative process it seems incredibly liberating to be able to access these more negative darker emotions and acknowledge them. So I worked on the album daily for I think it was six weeks, and each day I was more or less writing a track, and I'd flesh it out over time, and at the end of each day I'd listen back to what I'd done and feel elated by what I heard, which was an odd way to relate to the content of the material because of its nature in essence. But I felt like, Gosh, this doesn't sound like anything I've ever done before, or anything I'd heard before, so it felt very exciting.

So once I'd left that wonderful cocoon in which one could explore these emotions, I entered back into the real world of those emotions, and it was still an extremely difficult time, but as I think it was Robert Lowell said, ugly emotions produce beautiful poetry sometimes, and that's definitely true of Blemish."

== Writing and recording ==
Blemish was produced by Sylvian and recorded over six weeks between February and March 2003 at his Samadhi Sound Studio. There was an immediacy to creating the album that allowed the singer to not overthink the lyrics; he described the recording as very instantaneous: "You put something improvised on the guitar down on the hard drive and immediately responded to that lyrically. Within a couple of hours, you have a complete set of lyrics and a melodic line. So I'd record that on the spot, which allows me to be less cautious about what's revealed." After the rapid recording of the record, it was left in its "natural state," which Sylvian says was opposed to "producing something over deliberated and refined". Flux magazine says this improvised nature gives the album "a sincere sense of urgency." Reviewer Chris Jones felt Sylvian's "singular extemporised recording processed" freed him from "any previous sense of precious perfectionism".

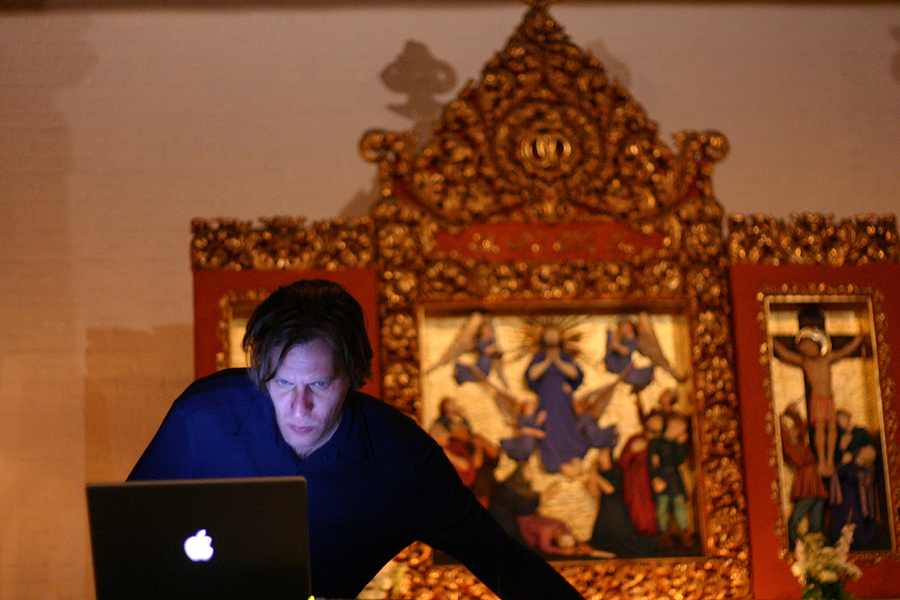
Christian Fennesz was one of Sylvian's collaborators on Blemish.

Sylvian improvised much of Blemish alone, with the exception of three tracks with free improvisation guitarist Derek Bailey and one with electronic musician Christian Fennesz, who joined the recording sessions two weeks after it began, by which point Sylvian had already completed four songs. He wished to work with a musician who was exploring modern virtual filtering systems, but was unable to find someone that fit his aesthetic; instead, during the recording of the album, Fennesz contacted Sylvian regarding work he wanted his involvement in, "and so, in a roundabout way," Sylvian found an ideal collaborator for the record. This was unlike Sylvian's earlier previous solo projects, where he would seek out the musicians he decided beforehand would be ideal. Meanwhile, he approached Bailey for the album at a joint concert he was playing with Milo Fine; although Bailey agreed, he was unsure why Sylvian pursued him.

Sylvian had decided he had taken the form of pop songs to their pinnacle with his previous album, Dead Bees on a Cake (1999), and when beginning work on Blemish, he had the desire "to eradicate the past and to find a whole new vocabulary for myself. At first, you are working from pure intuition. You are not sure where you are going; later, you begin to understand where the vocabulary is leading you and how to make it speak for you in a more profound way." In addition to the new sonic experimentation on the album, Sylvian's voice, while retaining his signature vibrato reminiscent of Bryan Ferry, was closely microphoned, and his harmonies were intimately double tracked. Sylvian reflected on the recording sessions: "Living through these emotions was very difficult, but finding a voice for them was so cathartic, and after that six-week period, I'd felt I'd worked through some very difficult emotions. I felt an enormous amount of release."

== Composition ==
=== Lyrics ===
Written about his divorce with Chavez, Sylvian's lyrics on Blemish are more honest and emotionally open and less oblique than on previous albums, despite "numerous disfigurations of clear-cut linear thought," according to critic Andy Kellman. Sylvian, who described the record as a "portrait of a person in crisis," had not worked with a "complex set of emotions" that had not already reached a resolution in his music before, and this time, situated in the middle of his breakup, "there was no resolution, there was no way of projecting that onto the material- an artificial sense that everything will be all right in the end, everything resolves, everything is okay. There was none of that with the material. It was in the heat of that complexity of emotions, of trying to face them head on and not look away." Sylvian conceived the lyrics to explore "everything I couldn't face head on in real life" and delved deeper into emotions "that weren't profound to begin with," such as hate, to see how far he could go. Sylvian explained: "The level of hate I was experiencing wasn't that intense, but I wanted the challenge of finding out what that felt like. It was like automatic writing."

The musician felt that the expression of anger had changed as he got older, a change represented by the relevant parts of Blemish: "[A]s you get older, that gets digested and surfaces in entirely different ways. There can be microbeats in the body of a composition that express anger so much more succinctly than a power chord, or an enraged vocal. I mean, 'The Only Daughter' is a piece of murderous feeling. It could be describing a murder that's already taken place." Nonetheless, Dave Gavan of The Quietus considers Blemish to be "a surprisingly recrimination-free affair as divorce albums go," highlighting the lines "The trouble is / It's impossible to know / Who's right and who's wrong" from the title track. While Sylvian denies any pathological forgiveness to the "even-handedness" of the lyric, he nonetheless conceded that "it's possible to see through the anger and know that the degree of hurt you're experiencing is colouring everything. So there IS no wrong or right at the end of it. That's obviously the case. It takes two to make a relationship and there are different needs in different people. I couldn't take myself so seriously as to think that my viewpoint was the only one." The singer felt that, while the divorce was the impetus of Blemish, "I think it's got more to offer than that."

=== Music ===
Blemish is a fractured, stark, raw and intimate experimental album, combining Sylvian's ambient and song-based work. Sylvian, who called the album "an impromptu suite of songs for guitar, electronics and voice," performs alone for half of the album, accompanied by his electronic treatments and guitar, while appears on the remaining songs with either Bailey and Fennesz. The latter musician helps bring a glitch influence to the record, while the jagged guitar work of Bailey, who, in the words of one reviewer, plucks his guitars "as if their strings had been replaced by rusty barbed wire abound," is said to complement the "rougher hewn material" on the album and Sylvian's mournful voice. Bailey's guitar is low in the mix, and appear on particularly minimalist tracks. Writer David Toop felt an important sense of space on the record – which makes ambient use of the room it was recorded in – explaining:

"The record begins in a room, so begins as a record. Not so many recordings begin in rooms at this moment in time; they are not records so much as accumulations of data. Distinctive fluctuations of a tube amp, vibrato set to medium speed and high intensity, introduce us into the room space and its atmosphere. No gates, filtering or intrusive EQ; just the box singing to itself. No picked notes; just percussive impact now and then. Another guitar, further distant in the room, erupts in arrested distortion, clipped. The amplifiers speak, or the body of the guitar; frame work rather than systemic framework. 'I fall outside of her,' David Sylvian sings. The less 'real' silence (the room before and after music happens) surrounding recorded music, the more interesting real silence becomes."

The songs on the album eschew traditional melody, as well as standard pop structures, with Sylvian's vocals instead providing the sole line of melody and counterpoint to hold the music together. This is a departure from earlier Sylvian recordings, though his signature upfront vibrato vocals remain. Most of the songs are based around a single chord, although according to Jones, the material avoids becoming drone music due to the close attention "being repaid by a swarm of insectoid-glitches". According to biographer Martin Power, the music is often little more than "an echoing guitar chord or spare keyboard flourish," while reviewer Nick Southall says the melodies "are pulled apart so slowly and deliberately that you can see the joints and mechanisms of pop music, the purposeful analogue crackle becomes a dovetail for a small song made long, the dry, dawdling dramatics of his voice, at once ancient and modern, become a cog-wheel for a pop-opera soliloquy."

While clues concerning the album's troublesome background are apparent throughout Blemish, Andy Kellman of AllMusic said the messages being obscured by "meticulously organized sounds," like handclaps, rattling shopping trolleys and fragments of Bailey's delicate guitar work, as well as Sylvian's non-linear lyrics. While Sylvian's vocals are front and centre, with them being mixed extremely loudly until they took on a "confrontational" and "physical presence" when Sylvian played them back, Blemish is also the first album in which Sylvian distorted and chopped up his voice in a new, unnatural fashion. Bailey himself said of the album a year later that he felt Sylvian "works it quite well compared to what I do. He doesn't sing the same as what I play. [...] My impression is that his voice is so distinctive all the pieces sound the same - a very special voice and special words, but my impression is they're all the same."

=== Songs ===
"Blemish", which sets the tone of the album, is a minimal and cerebral track which throughout its near-14 minute duration features heavily echoed noises which swell and recede at a "disquieting but sunken volume," while Sylvian, in his upfront vocals, sings lines like "I fall outside of her" and "Life's for the taking, so they say, take it away." Tiny Mix Tapes felt the track highlights Sylvian's voice and also "emanates with the experimental style of both Fennesz and Bailey," despite neither of them appearing on the track. During the pauses between words, Toop noted "brief moments of difference tones, a low frequency bulge in the fabric," and notes the closeness of each sound on the song, particularly "the voice, small blemishes of noise, amp vibrato, a drifting, wavering tone, tiny inferences of digital environments. Nothing is covered, removed, detached, enhanced. The voice is a naked man, seated in a room unfurnished except by tremulous, broken sound waves."

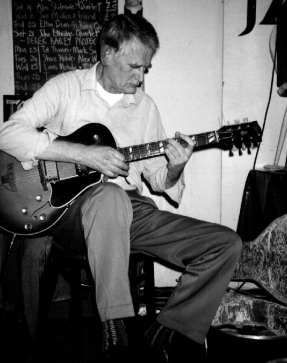
Derek Bailey (pictured in 1991).

One of three songs featuring Bailey, "The Good Son" features lyrics which seem almost sarcastic in their approach to Sylvian's turmoil, described by Toop as an instance of the singer working within a "physical discomfort zone". Bailey's guitar work comes in unexpected spasms which, according to Kellman, "carry and push, rather than support, Sylvian's voice." Feedback in the back of the studio between a different guitar and amp can be heard. On "The Only Daughter", Sylvian's vocals are chopped and snipped on several lines, while the song's ambience is cut by a quiet crackle and background tones. In his Sylvian biography, Power felt the song's subject concerns "a life poisoned and subsequently freed from the expectations of service".

The oscillating "The Heart Knows Better", containing a relatively simplistic message of redemption, features a shuddering, struck open guitar chord and slow vibrato. "She Is Not" features Bailey's guitar, while "Late Night Shopping" contains "mantra-like intonations," which, according to Jones, reinforce the sense of agoraphobia which emerges with the lyric "We can take the car. No one will be watching." It features Sylvian's double-tracked voice, a three-note bassline and handclaps, while squeals and creaks can be heard in the song's background. According to Southall, the handclaps help squeeze the song "back into a recognisable shape".

The final song to feature Bailey, "How Little We Need to Be Happy" has conversational lyrics, while according to Toop, Bailey's guitar shapes the words by "sniffing a harmonic implication out of blunted chords that shuffle in line, old men for a few steps, then shatter in mirror shards." Beginning with a sustained tone, the pivotal "A Fire in the Forest" closes the album in a "battered sense of optimism." Featuring Fennesz's arrangement, the song consists of "twisted fragments" with a melody barely surfacing, while Sylvian sings of his "search to reach the sunshine that awaits him above grey skies". Toop felt that "[t]his is a song of verses that become choruses," while Craig Roseberry of Billboard described the song as "tranquil, poetic and wistful".

== Release and promotion ==
Blemish was only initially available on the internet, via Sylvian's personal website. He made the decision believing the album would have been described within the music industry as "a difficult album" that would discourage distribution, and felt creating a website that could release Blemish without outsider distribution would still cater for those interested enough to find it. However, after the promising initial reviews of the album generated much interest, distributors became interested in Blemish and Sylvian's idea of creating a personal record label which could release the album on a wider scale grew. Eventually, his newly established Samadhi Sound record label released Blemish worldwide on 24 June 2003. The album artwork, designed by Yuka Fujii with artwork from Atsushi Fukui, features an illustration in the inner sleeve of Sylvian pushing a shopping cart through a forest covered in snow.

In late 2003, Sylvian embarked on the A Fire in the Forest tour in promotion of Blemish, playing in the United Kingdom, Italy, France, Germany and the Netherlands with a band line-up of Steve Jansen and Masatksu Takagi, using only keyboards, laptop computers and a single guitar. While recreating the album's songs with great care and "little intensity," some critics were distressed by some of the performances, including Nick Hasted of The Independent, who felt the band's September performance at London's Royal Festival Hall was marked by "a sense of almost catatonically muted distress".

On 7 September 2005, Samadhi Sound released The Good Son Vs. The Only Daughter - The Blemish Remixes, a remix album of each of the songs from Blemish remixed by different producers of different nationalities, a decision made by Sylvian who wanted the international selection of remixers to reflect Samadhi Sound's "global" image. He was happy with the remix album, saying that unlike other albums of the type, which he found to only be moderately successful in that remixers would often prefer to work on their own material rather than be paid to remix someone else's work, The Blemishes Remixes gave him and the label an opportunity to build up relationships with musicians such as Burnt Friedman and Akira Rabelais that could ultimately lead the path towards future collaborations. He also felt the remix album helped explore the "emotional core or aspects" of the original songs on Blemish and place them into new contexts in order to see "how they resonated".

== Critical reception and legacy ==
Professional ratings
Aggregate scores
| Source | Rating |
|---|---|
| Metacritic | 76/100 |
Review scores
| Source | Rating |
| Allmusic | 4.5/5 stars |
| Encyclopedia of Popular Music | 3/5 stars |
| Magnet | 7/10 |
| Mojo | 7/10 |
| Stylus Magazine | C |
| Tiny Mix Tapes | 3.5/5 stars |
| Uncut | 4/5 stars |

Blemish was released to favourable reviews from music critics, many heralding Sylvian's unexpected, darker new direction. At Metacritic, which assigns a normalized rating out of 100 to reviews from critics, the album received an average score of 76, which indicates "generally positive reviews," based on six reviews. Uncut hailed the "unexpected" album as "an extremely moving and potentially radical record," calling the Derek Bailey collaborations "astonishing" and "brilliant," and named it Sylvian's best work since Brilliant Trees (1984). Magnet wrote how Sylvian became grander when "[f]aced with conventional, if not threadbare, tunes," describing Blemish as "the subtlest opera of tweaked, quaking noises". Mojo described the album was "much sparser and looser than we are used to from David Sylvian". Nick Southall of Stylus Magazine described Blemish is neither a sad or happy album but a "strange observation and relapse". Under the Radar were less receptive, saying Sylvian's "heart-on-a-sleeve earnest emotionalism falls short of being impressive".

Andy Kellman of AllMusic called Blemish a "work of beautiful, desolate fragility," and "an unforeseen detour taken by David Sylvian, who has made eight of his most bare, anguished, and intense songs, all of which are neither pleasant nor the least bit settling." In The Wire, David Toop praised the production's inventive use of ambient room space. Chris Jones of the BBC said the album "startles with its originality," while Tiny Mix Tapes said the record has a more congruent focus than Sylvian's earlier music, while being unsavoury towards the moments when the album "is allowed to wonder". Craig Rosberry of Billboard felt that "although several entries tread a thin line between self-analysis and self-indulgence, the standouts brilliantly convey the album's pervasive themes of fractured relationships, emotional turmoil, redemption, truth and spiritual enlightenment."

The Wire ranked the album at number 2 in their list of the 50 best albums of 2003. Sylvian felt the lack of lyrical conceit on Blemish was key to its success, calling it his most "unguarded" work, "minimal in design". Nonetheless, many of his fans felt puzzled by Blemish; Sylvian explained how he felt some fans shared his cathartic experience of the album when listening to it, whereas others found it to be "my most inaccessible of recordings. Some seriously disliked it." He reflected that "Blemish is an album that people have to work at. That people are prepared to do just that, to spend some time getting to grips with it – well, that’s an act of true generosity on their part." While comparing the album to other similarly themed albums like Bob Dylan's Blood on the Tracks (1975) and Neil Young's Tonight's the Night (1975), Flux Magazine reflected that the album was "innovative" and "pioneered a sound". Jess Harvell of Pitchfork reflected upon Blemish as a "small masterpiece," while Chris Dahlen of the same website later said it "may be the most powerful album he's ever recorded, the rare case where an artist uses his maturity to show more pain than he had in his youth."

== Track listing ==
All tracks are written by David Sylvian, except as noted.

| No. | Title | Writer(s) | Length |
|---|---|---|---|
| 1. | "Blemish" | | 13:42 |
| 2. | "The Good Son" | Derek Bailey, Sylvian | 5:25 |
| 3. | "The Only Daughter" | | 5:28 |
| 4. | "The Heart Knows Better" | | 7:51 |
| 5. | "She Is Not" | Derek Bailey, Sylvian | 0:45 |
| 6. | "Late Night Shopping" | | 2:54 |
| 7. | "How Little We Need to Be Happy" | Derek Bailey, Sylvian | 3:22 |
| 8. | "A Fire in the Forest" | Sylvian, Christian Fennesz | 4:14 |
| Total length: | | | 43:41 |

Vinyl and Japanese CD bonus track
| No. | Title | Length |
|---|---|---|
| 9. | "Trauma" | 5:42 |
| Total length: | | 49:23 |

== Personnel ==
- David Sylvian – vocals, producer, engineer, mixing
- Derek Bailey – guitar
- Christian Fennesz – arranger, electronics
- Toby Hrycek-Robinson – engineer
- Yuka Fujii – art direction, design
- Atsushi Fukui – artwork, cover art
