= Bernd Friedmann =

German musician and producer (born 1965)

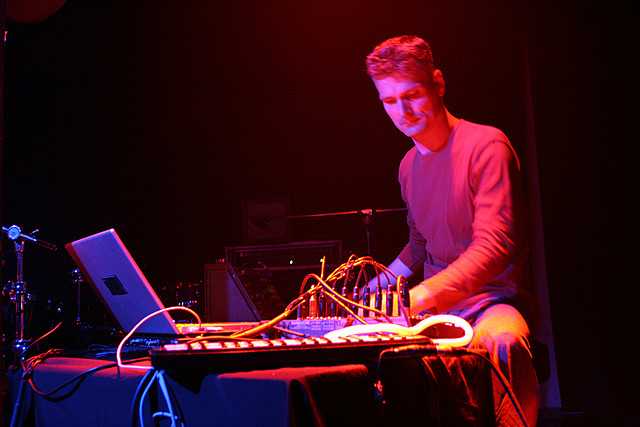
- Friedman at Festival Pomladi in Ljubljana (2008)

Background information
- Also known as: [see below]
- Born: Bernd Friedmann; July 14, 1965
- Origin: Coburg, Germany
- Genres: Electronic, glitch, IDM, techno, experimental
- Occupations: Musician, producer
- Years active: 1978–present
- Label: Various

Bernd Friedmann (also Burnt Friedman) (born 1965 in Coburg, Germany) is a German musician and producer who works under a variety of project names in the fields of electronic music, dub and jazz.

Friedmann was raised in Kassel, where he studied painting, performance and video at the Kunsthochschule Kassel from 1984 to 1990. His first recordings of found and self-built instruments, done with Wolfram Der Spyra from 1978 to 1982, were released under the name TOXH in 1989. Since then his projects have included:

Some More Crime (1990-1995, Friedmann and Frank Hernandez)
Drome (1991-1995, Friedmann and Frank Hernandez)
Nonplace Urban Field (1992-1997)
Flanger (1999-present, Friedmann and Atom Heart)
Nine Horses (2005-2007, Friedmann, David Sylvian, and Steve Jansen).

Friedmann's instruments include ambient noise and speech samples, analog synthesizers and organs, as well as toy piano, steel drum, kalimba, vibraphone, and melodica.

Since 2000 Friedmann runs his own "nonplace" label. He lives in Berlin.

== Selected discography ==
- Drome - Anachronism (1992)
- SMC (Some More Crime) - Another Domestic Drama in a Suburban Hell (1993)
- Drome - The Final Corporate Colonization Of The Unconscious (1993)
- Drome - The Final Corporate Remix of the Unconscious (1993)
- Drome - Once While Busy Counting the Virtues - a John Peel session in two parts, 30 minutes (BBC, Radio One, 1994)
- Nonplace Urban Field - N.U.F Said (1994)
- SMC (Some More Crime) - Fuzzysets (1995)
- Drome - Dromed (1995)
- Nonplace Urban Field - Nonplace Urban Field (1995)
- Nonplace Urban Field - Raum Für Notizen (1996)
- Nonplace Urban Field - Golden Star (1996) (Remix)
- Flanger - Templates (1997)
- Burnt Friedman & The Nu Dub Players - Just Landed (1999)
- Burnt Friedman - Plays Love Songs (1999)
- Flanger - Midnight Sound (1999)
- Burnt Friedman - Con Ritmo (2000)
- Flanger - Inner Space/Outer Space (2001)
- Replicant Rumba Rockers (2002) (Friedmann's Remix of Atom Heart-Material)
- Burnt Friedman & Jaki Liebezeit - Playing Secret Rhythms (2002)
- Burnt Friedman & The Nu Dub Players - Can't Cool (2003)
- Flanger - Spirituals (2005)
- Nine Horses - Snow Borne Sorrow (2005) (with David Sylvian and Steve Jansen)
- Burnt Friedman & Jaki Liebezeit - Secret Rhythms II (2005)
- Nine Horses - Money For All (2007) (with David Sylvian and Steve Jansen)
- Flanger - Nuclear Jazz (2007)
- Burnt Friedman - First Night Forever (2007)
- Burnt Friedman & Jaki Liebezeit - Secret Rhythms III (2008)
- Burnt Friedman & Jaki Liebezeit - Secret Rhythms IV (2011)
- Burnt Friedman - Zokuhen (2012)
- Burnt Friedman - Bokoboko (2012)
- Cyclopean - Cyclopean (2012)
- Burnt Friedman & Jaki Liebezeit - Secret Rhythms V (2013)
- Tohuwabohu - Tohuwabohu (2013)
- Burnt Friedman & Daniel Dodd-Ellis – Cease To Matter (2014)
- Flanger - Lollopy Dripper (2015)
- Burnt Friedman - The Pestle (2017)
- Burnt Friedman - Dead Saints Chronicles (2017)
- Burnt Friedman & Mohammad Reza Mortazavi – Yek (2017)
- Burnt Friedman - Anthology (1980-2017) (2017)
- Burnt Friedman - Musical traditions in Central Europe: Explorer Series Vol. 4 (2019)
- Burnt Friedman - Potential For Havoc (2020)
- Jaki Liebezeit & Burnt Friedman/Burnt Friedman & João Pais - Eurydike EP (2020)
- Mohammad Reza Mortazavi & Burnt Friedman - Yek 2 (2020)
- Burnt Friedman & João Pais Filipe - Automatic Music Vol.1: Mechanics Of Waving (2022)
- Burnt Friedman - Hexenschuss (2023)
