= Weatherbox (album) =

Box set by David Sylvian
- Released: 13 November 1989
- Genre: Ambient
- Labels: Virgin; DSCD1
- Producers: David Sylvian and Steve Nye

David Sylvian chronology
Flux and Mutability (1989)	Weatherbox (1989)	Rain Tree Crow (1991)

Weatherbox is a five-CD limited-edition box set by David Sylvian, released in 1989. Only 5000 copies were produced. The set comprises Sylvian's first four albums: Brilliant Trees, Alchemy: An Index of Possibilities, Gone to Earth and Secrets of the Beehive; and was, at the time, the only way to acquire all of the songs from Gone to Earth on compact disc.

Weatherbox is notable for giving each disc entirely new artwork based around the classical elements. The second half of Gone to Earth was retitled Gone to Earth Instrumental for this box set. The song "Preparations for a Journey" from Alchemy was removed, despite being part of the original album, and replaced by two tracks issued as B-sides to the "Pop Song" single. Gone to Earth was quietly remastered for Weatherbox. Also, the re-recorded "Forbidden Colours (Version)", included on the original CD of Secrets of the Beehive was removed.

The art for Weatherbox was designed by Russell Mills and Dave Coppenhall, and included a poster featuring Sylvian's discography on one side and art by Russell Mills on the other. The liner notes for Weatherbox were provided by Steve Lake, with photos by Russell Mills and Alistar Thain. A Japanese edition of the box set, with an additional 54-page booklet designed by Shinro Otake and Katsuhiro Kinoshita and the lyrics are printed both in Japanese and English, was also produced.

== Track listing ==
All tracks are written by David Sylvian, except as noted.

Disc 1: Tree: Brilliant Trees
No.	Title	Length
1.	"Pulling Punches"	5:02
2.	"The Ink in the Well"	4:30
3.	"Nostalgia"	5:41
4.	"Red Guitar"	5:09
5.	"Weathered Wall" (Sylvian, Jon Hassell)	5:44
6.	"Backwaters"	4:52
7.	"Brilliant Trees" (Sylvian, Hassell)	8:39
Total length:		39:37

Disc 2: Stone: Alchemy
No.	Title	Length
1.	"Words with the Shaman: Pt. 1 Ancient Evening" (Sylvian/Hassell)	5:11
2.	"Words with the Shaman: Pt.2 Incantation" (Sylvian/Hassell)	3:30
3.	"Words with the Shaman: Pt.3 Awakening – Songs from the Treetops" (Sylvian/Hassell/Steve Jansen)	5:21
4.	"The Stigma Of Childhood (Kin)"	8:30
5.	"A Brief Conversation Ending in Divorce"	3:30
6.	"Steel Cathedrals (Soundtrack from the Short Film by D. Sylvian and Y. Yamaguchi)" (Sylvian/Ryuichi Sakamoto)	18:55
Total length:		44:57

Disc 3: Earth: Gone to Earth
No.	Title	Length
1.	"Taking the Veil"	4:40
2.	"Laughter and Forgetting"	2:40
3.	"Before the Bullfight"	9:45
4.	"Gone to Earth" (Robert Fripp/Sylvian)	3:06
5.	"Wave"	9:11
6.	"River Man"	4:54
7.	"Silver Moon"	6:19
Total length:		40:45

Disc 4: Water: Gone to Earth Instrumental
No.	Title	Length
1.	"The Healing Place"	5:34
2.	"Answered Prayers" (Bill Nelson/Sylvian)	3:10
3.	"Where the Railroad Meets the Sea"	2:52
4.	"The Wooden Cross"	5:04
5.	"Silver Moon Over Sleeping Steeples"	2:22
6.	"Camp Fire : Coyote Country" (Fripp/Sylvian)	3:51
7.	"A Bird of Prey Vanishes into a Bright Blue Cloudless Sky"	3:16
8.	"Home"	4:33
9.	"Sunlight Seen Through Towering Trees"	3:02
10.	"Upon This Earth" (Fripp/Sylvian)	6:30
Total length:		40:14

Disc 5: Light: Secrets of the Beehive
No.	Title	Length
1.	"September"	1:17
2.	"The Boy With the Gun"	5:19
3.	"Maria"	2:49
4.	"Orpheus"	4:51
5.	"The Devil's Own"	3:12
6.	"When Poets Dreamed of Angels"	4:51
7.	"Mother and Child"	3:15
8.	"Let the Happiness In"	5:37
9.	"Waterfront"	3:23
Total length:		34:34

== Weatherbox Sampler ==
A CD sampler was released to promote the box set and is now itself a collector's item. It is housed in a slip-cased slimline jewel case and is notable for containing "Pop Song", a song that was not included in the box set itself, but released as a stand-alone single around the same time. "Pop Song" was later included on the compilations Everything and Nothing and A Victim of Stars 1982-2012.

No.	Title	Length
1.	"Pop Song"	4:30
2.	"Pulling Punches"	5:02
3.	"Red Guitar"	5:09
4.	"Taking the Veil"	4:40
5.	"Orpheus"	4:51
Total length:		24:12
