= Camphor (album) =

Compilation album by David Sylvian
- Released: 27 May 2002
- Genre: Alternative rock, ambient, world music
- Label: Venture/Virgin
- Producer: David Sylvian

David Sylvian chronology
Everything and Nothing (2000)	Camphor (2002)	Blemish (2003)

Professional ratings
Review scores
Source	Rating
AllMusic	1.5/5 stars
Encyclopedia of Popular Music	3/5 stars
Pitchfork	6.6/10

Camphor is a David Sylvian compilation album released in 2002 as a companion to Everything and Nothing. The focus is on his instrumental work.

== Background ==
Both "Camphor" and "The Song Which Gives the Key to Perfection" were originally released on the bonus CD included with Everything and Nothing tour book.

In "The Song Which Gives the Key to Perfection" Sylvian sings a chapter from a Hindu holy text, sung in the original Sanskrit from the Chandi Path.

Various tracks appear either remixed or in shortened versions: "Wave" has been cut to the last segment of the original song which omits the vocal parts. New original sounds orchestrated by Simon Jeffes were added. "Mother and Child (remix)" has the vocal part played instead by a trumpet and the music was sampled and remixed by Jan Bang and Erik Honoré. "Upon This Earth" is shorter. The first two minutes were cut, so Robert Frost poem "The Foreboding" is no longer heard and pitch is changed.

It was released in two versions, a standard single disc jewel case (CDVE 962) and a limited edition 2CD digipak (CDVEX 962).

== Track listing ==
=== Disc One ===
1. "All of My Mother's Names"
2. "Red Earth (As Summertime Ends)"
3. "Answered Prayers"
4. "The Song Which Gives the Key to Perfection (Siddha Kunjika Stotram)
  - originally featured on the CD accompanying the 2002 Everything and Nothing Tour Programme
5. "New Moon at Red Deer Wallow"
6. "Praise (Pratah Smarami)"
7. "Wave [Version]"
8. "Mother and Child [Version]"
9. "Plight (The Spiralling of Winter Ghosts) [Detail]"
10. "Upon This Earth [Remix]"
11. "Big Wheels in Shanty Town"
12. "The Healing Place"
13. "Camphor"
  - originally featured on the CD accompanying the 2002 Everything and Nothing Tour Programme
14. "A Brief Conversation Ending in Divorce"

=== Disc Two (Limited Edition Only) ===
1. "Plight (The Spiralling of Winter Ghosts) [Remixed Version]"
2. "Mutability (A New Beginning Is in the Offing) [Detail]"
3. "Premonition (Giant Empty Iron Vessel) [Remixed Version]"

Disc one:

- Tracks 1, 6 from Dead Bees on a Cake.
- Tracks 2, 5, 11 from Rain Tree Crow.
- Tracks 3, 7, 10, 12 from Gone to Earth.
- Track 8 from Secrets of the Beehive.
- Track 14 from Pop Song single.

== Personnel ==
Exclusively about the unreleased or re-recorded tracks.

- "Answered Prayers": Bill Nelson (acoustic guitar), David Sylvian (guitar, voice).
- "The Song Which Gives the Key to Perfection": Shree Maa (composer, tambura), David Sylvian (vocals, electric piano, guitar, bass, arrangement).
- "Wave (Version)" Steve Jansen (drums), Robert Fripp (guitar), Simon Jeffes (orchestration), David Sylvian (Hammond, synth, bass, remixing).
- "Mother and Child": David Torn (acoustic guitar), Danny Thompson (double bass), Danny Cummings (percussion), Ryuichi Sakamoto (piano, Hammond), Erik Honoré (remixing, sampler), Jan Bang (remixing, sampler, synth), Nils Petter Molvær (trumpet, effects).
- "Plight (The Spiralling of Winter Ghosts) Detail": Holger Czukay (electronics, organ, piano, orchestra, effects), David Sylvian (harmonium, guitar, synth, remixing).
- "Upon This Earth": Robert Fripp (guitar), David Sylvian (guitar, piano, synth, remixing).
- "The Healing Place": Bill Nelson (guitar solo), David Sylvian (guitar, synth).
- "Camphor": David Sylvian (all instruments).
