= Everything and Nothing =

Compilation album by David Sylvian
- Released: October 2000
- Recorded: 1980–1999
- Genre: Alternative rock, jazz
- Length: 139:26; 163:26 (limited edition)
- Label: Virgin
- Producer: David Sylvian, Steve Nye

David Sylvian chronology
Approaching Silence (1999)	Everything and Nothing (2000)	Camphor (2002)

Professional ratings
Aggregate scores
Source	Rating
Metacritic	80/100
Review scores
Source	Rating
AllMusic	4/5 stars
The Encyclopedia of Popular Music	4/5 stars
Pitchfork	6.1/10

Everything and Nothing is a compilation album by David Sylvian. Released in October 2000, the album contains previously released and unreleased, re-recorded, and alternate versions of tracks from Sylvian's twenty years with Virgin Records. The record peaked at no.57 in the UK albums chart.

== Release formats ==
It was released in two versions, a standard 2CD jewel case (CDVD 2897) and (in the UK) as a limited edition 3CD digipak (CDVDX 2897).

== Background ==
In addition to tracks from Sylvian's solo career and earlier with the group Japan ("Ghosts"), the album also includes previously unreleased material ("Some Kind of Fool", "The Scent of Magnolia", "Ride" and "Cover Me with Flowers", among others) along with collaborations ("Bamboo Houses" and "Heartbeat" with Ryuichi Sakamoto and "Buoy" with Mick Karn). The songs "Come Morning" and "Golden Way" were taken from the 1995 album Marco Polo by the World music duo Nicola Alesini & Pier Luigi Andreoni, on which Sylvian provided vocals for three of the songs.

"Thoroughly Lost to Logic", a piece written 1991, contained Sylvian reading a poem, which appeared on Ryuichi Sakamoto's composition "Salvation" from his work "Discord" released in 1998. This version was completed in 2000.

Four tracks on the album were recorded during the making of Sylvian's 1999 album Dead Bees on a Cake but did not make the final cut on the album. The compilation additionally derives its title from a line in the Dead Bees on a Cake song "Thalheim".

== Track listing ==
All tracks are written by David Sylvian, except where noted.

Disc 1: E
No.	Title	Writer(s)	Original album	Length
1.	"The Scent of Magnolia"		from Dead Bees on a Cake sessions	5:36
2.	"Heartbeat (Tainai Kaiki II)" (Remix)	Ryuichi Sakamoto, Sylvian, Arto Lindsay	originally from Heartbeat by Ryuichi Sakamoto	5:17
3.	"Blackwater"	Sylvian, Steve Jansen, Mick Karn, Richard Barbieri	Rain Tree Crow by Rain Tree Crow	4:22
4.	"Albuquerque (Dobro #6)"	Sylvian, Bill Frisell	from Dead Bees on a Cake sessions	1:21
5.	"Ride"		from Secrets of the Beehive sessions	8:00
6.	"The Golden Way" (Remix)	Sylvian, Nicola Alesini	originally from Marco Polo by Alesini & Andreoni	6:01
7.	"Ghosts" (2000 Remix)		originally from Tin Drum by Japan	3:47
8.	"Pop Song"		Pop Song	4:34
9.	"Every Colour You Are"	Sylvian, Jansen, Karn, Barbieri	Rain Tree Crow by Rain Tree Crow	4:46
10.	"Wanderlust"		Dead Bees on a Cake	6:47
11.	"God's Monkey"	Sylvian, Robert Fripp, Trey Gunn, David Bottrill	The First Day by David Sylvian and Robert Fripp	5:02
12.	"Let the Happiness In"		Secrets of the Beehive	5:35
13.	"I Surrender"		Dead Bees on a Cake	9:28
14.	"Thoroughly Lost to Logic"	Sylvian, Keith Tippett		1:17
Total length:				71:53

Disc 2: N
No.	Title	Writer(s)	Original album	Length
1.	"Jean the Birdman"	Sylvian, Robert Fripp, Trey Gunn, David Bottrill	The First Day by David Sylvian and Robert Fripp	4:12
2.	"Cover Me with Flowers"		from Dead Bees on a Cake sessions	6:33
3.	"Boy with the Gun"		Secrets of the Beehive	5:14
4.	"River Man"		Gone to Earth	4:57
5.	"Aparna and Nimisha (Dobro # 5)"	Sylvian, Bill Frisell	from Dead Bees on a Cake sessions	0:56
6.	"Midnight Sun"	Sylvian, Johnny Moore, Charles Brown, Eddie Williams	Dead Bees on a Cake	4:02
7.	"Orpheus"		Secrets of the Beehive	4:48
8.	"Some Kind of Fool"		from Gentlemen Take Polaroids sessions by Japan	7:31
9.	"Cries and Whispers"	Sylvian, Jansen, Karn, Barbieri	Rain Tree Crow by Rain Tree Crow	2:33
10.	"Godman"		Dead Bees on a Cake	3:58
11.	"Laughter and Forgetting"		Gone to Earth	2:33
12.	"Buoy"	Sylvian, Karn	Dreams of Reason Produce Monsters by Mick Karn	5:16
13.	"Weathered Wall" (Remix)	Sylvian, Jon Hassell	originally from Brilliant Trees	5:43
14.	"Bamboo Houses" (Remix)	Sylvian, Sakamoto	originally from Bamboo Houses ∙ Bamboo Music by Sylvian ∙ Sakamoto	5:21
15.	"Come Morning" (Remix)	Sylvian, Nicola Alesini	originally from Marco Polo by Alesini & Andreoni	3:56
Total length:				67:33

Disc 3: + Bonus (Limited edition only)
No.	Title	Writer(s)	Original album	Length
1.	"The Scent of Magnolia" (Edit)			5:04
2.	"The Blinding Light of Heaven"	Sylvian, Fripp, Gunn, Bottrill	from The First Day sessions by David Sylvian and Robert Fripp	4:42
3.	"The Scent of Magnolia" (Portobello Mix)			5:42
4.	"Brilliant Trees" (Version 2000)		originally from Brilliant Trees	8:32
Total length:				24:00

== Personnel ==
This is a list of guest musicians exclusively about the unreleased tracks. For the other tracks, see respective albums.

- "The Scent of Magnolia": Bill Frisell (guitar), Ingrid Chavez (vocals), John Giblin (bass), Ryuichi Sakamoto (string arrangement, sampler, piano), Andreas Allen (drum programming), Sebastian Morton (drum programming).
- "Albuquerque (Dobro #6)": Bill Frisell (dobro).
- "Ride": Ryuichi Sakamoto (piano, string arrangement) Steve Jansen (drums), Danny Thompson (double bass), David Torn (electric guitar), Mark Isham (trumpet), Phil Palmer (acoustic guitar).
- "The Golden Way": Damiano Puliti (cello), Nicola Alesini (soprano sax, keyboards, drum programming), Steve Jansen (drum programming), Pier Luigi Andreoni (keyboards).
- "Pop Song": John Taylor (piano), Steve Jansen.
- "Thoroughly Lost to Logic": Keith Tippett (piano), Mark Sanders (drums)
- "Cover Me with Flowers": Steve Jansen (percussion), Steve Tibbetts (guitars).
- "Aparna and Nimisha (Dobro # 5)": Bill Frisell (dobro).
- "Some Kind of Fool": Ingrid Chavez (vocals), Ann O'Dell (string and brass arrangement) Mick Karn (sax, brass arrangement), Rob Dean (guitar), Richard Barbieri (piano), Steve Jansen (drums), Simon House (violin).
- "Buoy": Steve Jansen (drums, vocals), Mick Karn (vocals, saxophones, keyboards)
- "Come Morning": Arturo Stalteri (bouzouki), Nicola Alesini (keyboards, clarinet, drum programming, sax), Pier Luigi Andreoni (keyboards, percussion)
- "The Blinding Light of Heaven" (studio): Jerry Marotta, Marc Anderson, Trey Gunn.
