= Dead Bees on a Cake =

1999 studio album by David Sylvian

Studio album by David Sylvian
- Released: 29 March 1999 – 9 April 1999 (Japan)
- Recorded: Right Track Studios, New York – Real World Studios, Box, Wiltshire – Sound House Studio, Seattle – Atma Sound, Minneapolis – Seedy Underbelly, Minneapolis – Synergy Studio, Napa
- Genre: Art rock · jazz fusion · world
- Length: 69:46 (CD); 83:42 (vinyl)
- Label: Virgin
- Producer: David Sylvian

David Sylvian chronology
Damage: Live (1994)	Dead Bees on a Cake (1999)	Approaching Silence (1999)

Professional ratings
Review scores
Source	Rating
AllMusic	2.5/5 stars
Encyclopedia of Popular Music	3/5 stars
Entertainment Weekly	B+
NME	8/10
Pitchfork	7.3/10

Dead Bees on a Cake is the fifth studio album by British singer-songwriter David Sylvian, released in March 1999 on Virgin Records. It was his first solo album in 12 years since Secrets of the Beehive. The album peaked at no. 31 in the UK Albums Chart at release and contained his last UK Top 40 single to date in "I Surrender" (no. 40).

In 2018, the album was released on double vinyl for the first time for Record Store Day. This pressing included four songs originally intended for the album (and previously released as part of Everything and Nothing), and a restructured track order.

== Background ==
Sylvian started out working with Ryuichi Sakamoto in New York and they did three weeks work together. Initially Sakamoto was co-producing the project with Sylvian, and after three weeks work they had about three days work down and it was obvious things weren't working as well as they usually were between the two; thus, they decided to retire the project. Some of the recording sessions ended up on the album, including Sakamoto's piano playing along with string and horn arrangements, but Sylvian was dissatisfied with the overall results.

They did a few other sessions in New York and Sylvian then set up a second set of sessions in the Real World Studios in England with a different group of musicians, but Sylvian was again not pleased with the recording session. Sylvian had never experienced such unrewarding recording sessions and he didn't think the material was that difficult, so it was baffling.

Sylvian returned to Minneapolis where he was then living and started sampling the material that he had and reconstructing the arrangements to try and put together a basis from which to get working on the album. Three months and there was very little to show for it. That was the beginning, until he found himself just taking on roles that he hadn't really initially foreseen himself taking on: being the sole producer, taking care of engineering, becoming the maintenance guy, his own studio, anything that just gets down to the basic work of being creative and recording. He reconstructed the pieces through using various samples from a multitude of performances. The challenge really was to keep the whole thing feeling very organic, like there was a group of people playing together, that sonically it sounded very much a part of a whole, which was quite a challenge actually. Probably a greater challenge than actually putting the arrangements together.

Sylvian said about the album 2012:

"I just came up with so many problems with producing it. So many avenues just ended in a kind of a dead end. Using a great deal of new technology this time, a lot of files were lost along the way, but that wasn't the only problem. Certainly working with different musicians, a couple of producers, I just put a halt to the project numerous times. And at the same time I'd moved to the United States, I'd got married, I had my first child and I was very much involved in that life. I was just so involved in the bringing up of my first daughter and following a far more intensely spiritual path and a spiritual discipline, and that was kind of leading me away from a concentrated focus on music. And every time I returned to the work I liked what I heard, but again every time I got re-immersed in it I would come up against an obstacle of some kind. I just thought it did not want to be completed and thought that maybe this was it. I was happy with the work. It was poorly received, but it did bring my relationship with Virgin Records to an end. I didn't realise how much that would mean to me, but it really did liberate me, and I only recognised that fact once I was in the studio recording Blemish and realising that I really didn't have to go round to sell this idea to anyone. It really opened things up for me, moving away from a major label like that".

== Track listing ==
CD pressing

All tracks are written by David Sylvian, except as noted.

No.	Title	Writer(s)	Length
1.	"I Surrender"		9:24
2.	"Dobro #1"	Sylvian, Bill Frisell	1:30
3.	"Midnight Sun"	Sylvian, Johnny Moore, Charles Brown, Eddie Williams	4:00
4.	"Thalheim"		6:07
5.	"God Man"		4:02
6.	"Alphabet Angel"		2:06
7.	"Krishna Blue"		8:08
8.	"The Shining of Things"		3:09
9.	"Café Europa"		6:58
10.	"Pollen Path"		3:25
11.	"All of My Mother's Names (Summers with Amma)"		6:11
12.	"Wanderlust"		6:43
13.	"Praise (Pratah Smarami)"	Shree Maa, Sylvian	4:02
14.	"Darkest Dreaming"	Sylvian, Djivan Gasparyan	4:01
Total length:			69:46

2018 vinyl pressing

All tracks are written by David Sylvian, except as noted.

Side A
No.	Title	Writer(s)	Length
1.	"I Surrender"		9:24
2.	"The Scent of Magnolia"		5:36
3.	"Dobro #1"	Sylvian, Bill Frisell	1:30
4.	"Midnight Sun"	Sylvian, Johnny Moore, Charles Brown, Eddie Williams	4:00
Total length:			20:30

Side B
No.	Title	Writer(s)	Length
1.	"Cover Me with Flowers"		6:33
2.	"Krishna Blue"		8:08
3.	"Albuquerque (Dobro #6)"	Sylvian, Bill Frisell	1:21
Total length:			15:32

Side C
No.	Title	Writer(s)	Length
1.	"Thalheim"		6:07
2.	"Alphabet Angel"		2:06
3.	"God Man"		4:02
4.	"Café Europa"		6:58
5.	"Aparna and Nimisha (Dobro # 5)"	Sylvian, Bill Frisell	0:56
6.	"Pollen Path"		3:25
Total length:			23:34

Side D
No.	Title	Writer(s)	Length
1.	"The Shining of Things"		3:09
2.	"Wanderlust"		6:43
3.	"All of My Mother's Names (Summers with Amma)"		6:11
4.	"Praise (Pratah Smarami)"	Shree Maa, Sylvian	4:02
5.	"Darkest Dreaming"	Sylvian, Djivan Gasparyan	4:01
Total length:			24:06

== Personnel ==
- David Sylvian – vocals, guitars (all tracks except 2, 6, 8), keyboards (exc. 8, 13), bass (5), drum programming (4, 5, 7, 9), samples (1, 3, 10, 14), string arrangements (1, 8)
- Ryuichi Sakamoto – Fender Rhodes (1, 6, 11), orchestrations and string arrangements (1, 8), brass arrangements (3), sampled guitar and bansuri (7), insects (10)
- Tommy Barbarella – Fender Rhodes (4, 12)
- Marc Ribot – electric guitar (1, 3, 11), acoustic guitar (5, 10), slide guitar (10)
- Bill Frisell – dobro (2, 7), acoustic guitar (7)
- Kenny Wheeler – flugelhorn (1, 4)
- Lawrence Feldman – flute (1)
- Deepak Ram – bansuri (7)
- John Giblin – bass (4, 12)
- Chris Minh Doky – double bass (11)
- Steve Jansen – percussion (1, 7, 9), loops (4, 5), cymbals (4)
- Ged Lynch – original drum track (4), drums (10, 12)
- Skoota Warner – original drum track (5), drums (11)
- Talvin Singh – tabla and percussion (7, 11)
- Steve Tibbetts – gong (7)
- Ingrid Chavez – vocals (7, 9)
- Shree Maa – vocals (13)

== Production ==
- David Sylvian – producer, additional engineer, sound mixing
- Dave Kent – sound engineer and mixing, studio maintenance
- Jacquie Turner – assistant engineer
- Matt Curry – assistant engineer
- Scott Crane – assistant engineer
- Bob Ludwig – audio mastering

=== Art work ===
- David Sylvian – art director
- Yuka Fujii – art director, artwork co-ordinator
- Shinya Fujiwara – drawings
- Anton Corbijn – photography
- Ingrid Chavez – inlay portrait
- Russell Mills – design (shed)
- Michael Webster – design assistance (storm)
