= More Blank Than Frank/Desert Island Selection =

More Blank Than Frank / Desert Island Selection

Compilation album by Brian Eno
- Released: March 1986
- Recorded: 1973–1977
- Genre: Rock, ambient
- Label: EG
- Producer: Brian Eno

Professional ratings
Review scores
Source	Rating
AllMusic	4/5 stars
Rolling Stone	5/5 stars

More Blank Than Frank and Desert Island Selection are 1986 compilation albums of music by Brian Eno. More Blank Than Frank is the title given to the vinyl LP and cassette releases, and Desert Island Selection is the name used for the CD version. The three versions were issued at the same time, though they differ somewhat in the ordering and in the songs that were used. The LP features 10 tracks, the cassette, 12, and the CD, 11.

The releases are compilations of many of Eno's earlier solo works, ranging from 1973's Here Come the Warm Jets to 1978's Music for Airports. The LP release contains a somewhat wider variety of material, including a couple of darker and rockier songs ("The Great Pretender" and "King's Lead Hat"). The CD release shares seven of its track selections with the LP, but, in comparison, features a more lopsided selection of Eno's earlier works, eschewing the harder, rockier numbers entirely in favor of softer pieces more akin to Eno's ambient work, and concluding with a six-minute edit of his ambient piece "1/1", taken from Music for Airports. The cassette release follows the LP's track selection and ordering, but inserts two songs, which are included on the CD but not the LP, into the running order. At the time of release, the CD version was significant in that it was the only CD version then available of any of Eno's earlier works.

The release was accompanied by the release of the book More Dark Than Shark, by Russell Mills, which includes a series of lithographs inspired by Eno's lyrics.

== Track listing ==
=== Desert Island Selection CD release ===
1. "Here He Comes" – 5:37
2. "Everything Merges With the Night" – 4:02
3. "I'll Come Running (To Tie Your Shoes)" – 3:38
4. "On Some Faraway Beach" (edit) – 3:38
5. "Spirits Drifting" – 2:39
6. "Back in Judy's Jungle" – 5:16
7. "St. Elmo's Fire" – 2:59
8. "No One Receiving" – 3:51
9. "Julie With..." – 5:51
10. "Taking Tiger Mountain" – 5:23
11. "1/1" (edit) – 6:08

=== More Blank Than Frank LP release ===
1. "Here He Comes"
2. "Everything Merges With the Night"
3. "I'll Come Running (To Tie Your Shoes)"
4. "On Some Faraway Beach"
5. "Taking Tiger Mountain"
6. "Backwater"
7. "St. Elmo's Fire"
8. "No One Receiving"
9. "The Great Pretender"
10. "King's Lead Hat"

=== More Blank Than Frank Cassette release ===
1. "Here He Comes"
2. "Everything Merges With the Night"
3. "On Some Faraway Beach"
4. "I'll Come Running (To Tie Your Shoes)"
5. "Julie With..."
6. "Taking Tiger Mountain"
7. "Backwater"
8. "St. Elmo's Fire"
9. "No One Receiving"
10. "The Great Pretender"
11. "Back in Judy's Jungle"
12. "King's Lead Hat"
