= Words with the Shaman =

EP by David Sylvian
- Released: 2 December 1985
- Recorded: 1985, London
- Genre: Ambient
- Length: 14:06
- Label: Virgin
- Producer: David Sylvian; Nigel Walker

David Sylvian chronology
Pulling Punches (1984)	Words with the Shaman (1985)	Taking the Veil (1986)

Words with the Shaman is a three-part instrumental suite by the English singer-songwriter David Sylvian. It was recorded in London in 1985 and released as an EP the same year on Virgin Records. It peaked at number 72 on the UK singles chart.

As Sylvian described in a liner note, Words with the Shaman was "conceived as musical footnotes of themes started earlier on the album Brilliant Trees and [...] developed as a collaborative group effort."

Words with the Shaman was also released in parallel as part of the limited edition cassette Alchemy: An Index of Possibilities along with two additional instrumental tracks (Preparations for a Journey and Steel Cathedrals). In 1989, the suite appeared on the second of four CDs in the Weatherbox set. The 1991 US reissue of Sylvian's Brilliant Trees album also contained Words with the Shaman. It was subsequently re-released on vinyl in 2019, again as part of the compilation album Alchemy: An Index of Possibilities.

== Track listing ==
1. "Pt. 1 Ancient Evening" (Sylvian/Hassell) – 5:14
2. "Pt. 2 Incantation" (Sylvian/Hassell) – 3:31
3. "Pt. 3 Awakening (Songs from the Tree Tops)" (Sylvian/Hassell/Jansen) – 5:19

== Personnel ==
- David Sylvian – keyboards, guitar, tapes
- Steve Jansen – drums, percussion, additional keyboards
- Jon Hassell – trumpet
- Holger Czukay – electronics, noises (radio)
- Percy Jones – fretless bass
