= Art Journal =

Art Journal or art journal may refer to:

- an art journal, a periodical on the topic of art
- Art diary, also known as an art journal, a daily journal kept by artists
- The Art Journal, a 19th-century British art magazine
- Art Journal (College Art Association journal), an American art journal, 1941–present
- Art Journal of the National Gallery of Victoria, also known as Art Journal, an Australian journal published under this name since 2011
