= Darshan (The Road to Graceland) =

Studio album by David Sylvian and Robert Fripp
- Released: 6 December 1993
- Recorded: 17 July–1 December 1993
- Genre: Alternative rock, art rock
- Length: 44:08
- Label: Virgin
- Producer: David Sylvian, Robert Fripp

David Sylvian and Robert Fripp chronology
The First Day (1993)	Darshan (The Road to Graceland) (1993)	Damage: Live (1994)

Darshan (The Road to Graceland) is the second of three collaborative productions of David Sylvian and Robert Fripp. It is a remix album; the first two tracks are remixes of the original song "Darshan" from their first album The First Day. The original version, written by David Sylvian, Robert Fripp, Trey Gunn and David Bottrill, is reissued here as final track. The first track is a remix by the Grid, and the second track—called "Darshana"—is a “reconstruction” by The Future Sound of London. It was released on 6 December 1993 as EP and CD Single on Virgin Records (SYLCD1 and VJCP 20013 in Japan).

== Track listing ==
1. "Darshan (Translucent Remix by The Grid)" (Sylvian, Fripp, Gunn, Bottrill) - Remixed by The Grid – 16:07
2. "Darshana" (Sylvian, Fripp, Gunn, Bottrill, Cobain, Dougans) - Reconstructed by The Future Sound of London – 10:11
3. "Darshan (The Road to Graceland)" (Sylvian, Fripp, Gunn, Bottrill) – 17:50

== Personnel ==
- David Sylvian – vocals, guitars, keyboard instruments, tapes
- Robert Fripp – guitars, frippertronics
- Trey Gunn – grand and tenor chapman stick, vocals
- Jerry Marotta – drums, percussion instruments
- Marc Anderson – percussion instruments
- David Bottrill – treatments, sampled percussion, computer programming
