= The Flying Guillotine =

The Flying Guillotine may refer to:

== Film ==
- The Guillotines, 2012 Hong Kong film direct by Andrew Lau
- The Flying Guillotine (film), a 1975 Hong Kong wuxia film directed by Ho Meng Hua
- Master of the Flying Guillotine, 1976 Taiwanese wuxia film directed by Jimmy Wang Yu

== Music ==
- "Flying Guillotine", song on the 2005 The 16 Deadly Improvs album The Return of the 16 Deadly Improvs
- "Flying Guillotine", song on the 1996 Buckethead album The Day of the Robot
- Master of the Flying Guillotine (album), 2005 debut album by American rapper Jumpsteady
