= Art diary =

An art diary, art journal or visual journal is a daily journal kept by artists, often containing both words and sketches, and occasionally including mixed media elements such as collages. Such books will frequently contain rough workings, in cartoon form, of ideas later to appear in finished works, as well as acting as a normal diary, by allowing the artist to record their day-to-day activities and emotions.

These diaries not only give art historians a valuable opportunity to explore the creation process of these finished works, but they are a useful biographical tool.

Many famous artists are known for their art diaries – the sketchbooks of Leonardo da Vinci are probably the best known example. Other artists to have used art journals include Frida Kahlo.

The concept of the art diary is also used by people working in related creative fields such as music; musician Brian Eno, for instance, is well known for his use of art diaries, excerpts from which were used in the Eno and Russell Mills book More Dark Than Shark. Photographers Peter Hill Beard and Dan Eldon, and artist Sabrina Ward Harrison are three other people noted for their art journals.

== See also ==
- Poetic diary
- Artist's book
- Artist's portfolio
- Scrapbooking
