= The 16 Deadly Improvs =

American improvisational progressive rock band

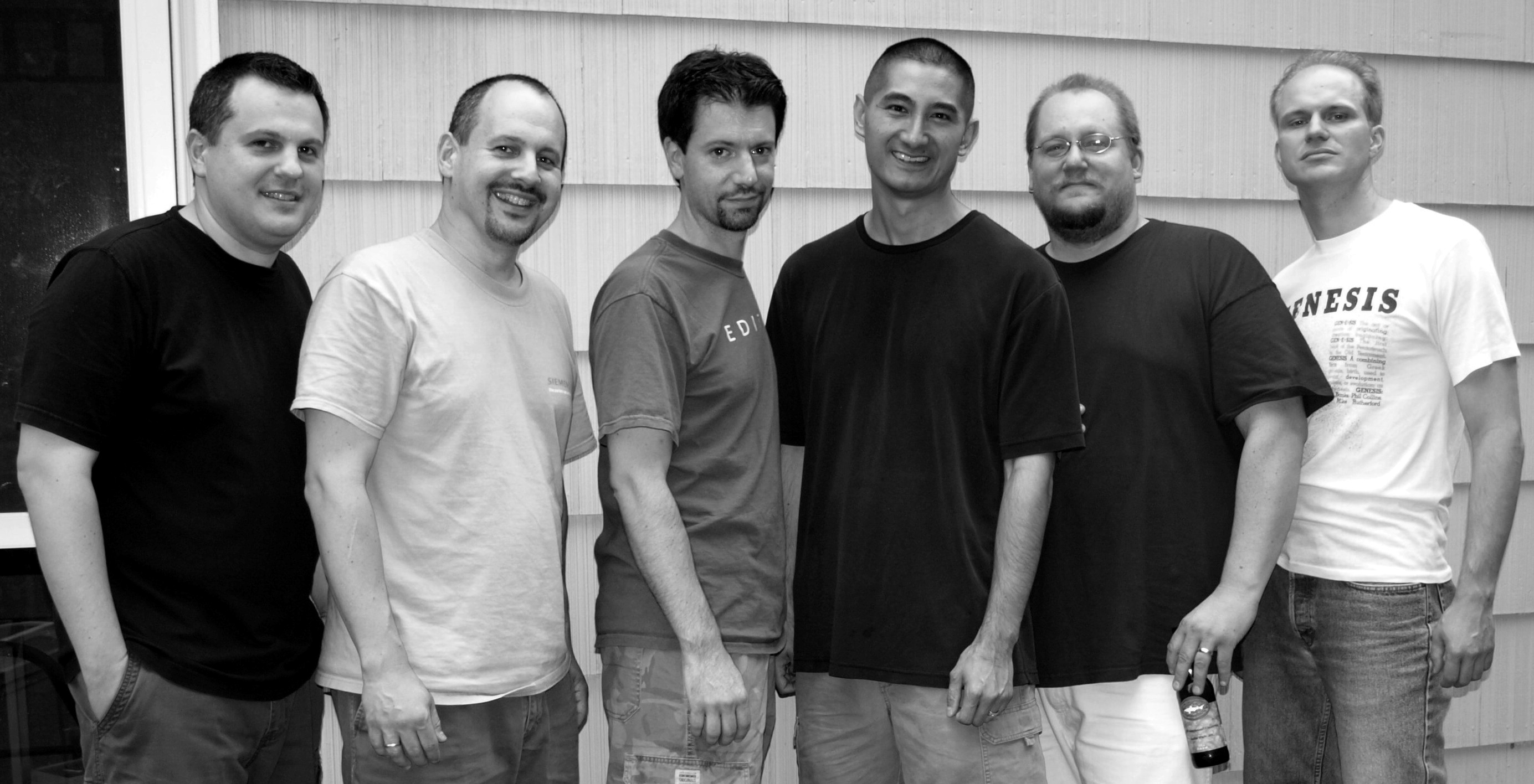

Background information
- Origin: United States
- Genres: Improvisational; Progressive rock Experimental
- Years active: 1995–present
- Labels: Rosemont Recordings
- Members: left to right: Nick Bohensky – guitar, keyboards Gene Bohensky – drums, keyboards Dave Wilson – drums, percussion Vin Villanueva – guitar Jeff Bridi – bass, vocals Mark Nowak – keyboards, vocals
- Website: www.16DeadlyImprovs.com

The 16 Deadly Improvs are an American improvisational progressive rock band based in Madison, New Jersey. They record and release music through their own label, Rosemont Recordings. They're noted for their unique sound which combines the elements of "traditional" improvisational blues and jazz with the "non traditional" styles of heavy metal, ambient, progressive rock and electronica. The majority of their music is performed together live in a studio without any prior rehearsals or sharing of musical thoughts before the recording process begins. This gives their recordings an overall warm organic feel that creates a completely refreshing listening experience. Although the band rarely plays live in front of an audience, they've been known to perform one-off shows over the past 30 years.

== History ==
=== Formation (1995) ===
The 16 Deadly Improvs were originally conceived in 1995 as a studio project involving musicians from the New Brunswick, New Jersey, alternative rock scene of the early 1990s: Nick Bohensky, Jeff Bridi, Mark Nowak and Dave Wilson of prog-metallers Bald Red Lady; Gene Bohensky of alt rock band Three Islands; Vin Villanueva from hardcore outfits Headstrong and Vision. Their aim was to experiment as an improvisational unit using the well-honed skills of each band member, while allowing for randomness in execution by encouraging members to play out of their comfort zone. This meant, at times, for certain members of the band to play completely different instruments other than their specialty. Musically, John Wetton era King Crimson was a major influence and starting point for the improvisational approach. Other notable artists that influenced their sound include Brian Eno, Rain Tree Crow, Yes, Gong, The Legendary Pink Dots, Porcupine Tree, Radiohead, Rush and Pink Floyd.

After recording in July 1995, the resulting session became The 16 Deadly Improvs, so named because of the editing of the sessions into what turned out to be 16 distinct tracks. While deemed a success by the unit, it was believed at the time that the project had run its course as Villanueva relocated to Ann Arbor, Michigan and began concentrating more on jazz music and Nowak settled in Brooklyn, New York.

=== The Return and The Challenge (2005–2006) ===
Nearly a decade had passed, with each of its members involved in other musical projects including Bridi, Bohensky and Wilson forming the hard-edged metal outfit, To The Bone. The relocation of Villanueva back to the east coast of the US in 2004 prompted the group to rejoin forces and adopt the moniker The 16 Deadly Improvs, recording 2005's The Return of The 16 Deadly Improvs.

In January 2006, the band recorded what was to become The Challenge of The 16 Deadly Improvs. While largely instrumental, it was the first album to feature the addition of vocals by Nowak and Bridi, who took two songs each on which to overdub their parts; a trend that has continued through each subsequent album. The Challenge would also become the first release to be made available to the public.

=== The Revenge and the Hospitality soundtrack (2007–2009) ===
2007 brought another unexpected relocation, with the departure of Nowak to Australia. However, the band found ways to continue to work, setting up one day sessions when all six members were available. During this time, the focus began to shift towards more overdubs of the raw tracks and additional production, all along retaining the original concept of improvisational music to the core.

In 2008, the band released The Revenge of The 16 Deadly Improvs with original artwork commissioned exclusively for the project by New Jersey–based graphic artist Keith Smerak of E6 Creative Group. The album features guest vocalist Jenn Weiss on the jazzy track "2/9" as well as additional lyrics being provided by Smerak on "In The Black" and the aforementioned "2/9".

The Revenge was almost instantly well received in prog-circles. Progressive rock site dprp.net stated "that some of the pieces aren’t a million miles removed from, say, Red-era King Crimson or even the instrumentals on Bowie’s Berlin albums (Low, "Heroes", Lodger). Most impressive is the way the improvisations often build and then devolve: this group (there are six members) can turn or stop on a dime, and they obviously are good at cueing each other when it’s time to take a new tack." Sea of Tranquility.org called The Revenge "a rock solid, seventy minute plus effort from top to bottom that is both full of risk and reward."

During this time, an instrumental version of the track "2/9" from The Revenge was included in the soundtrack for the direct to DVD release of the indie horror film Hospitality directed by Tony Ducret.

The same year, the band recorded another session, which after being shelved for over a year, was edited and produced during 2009 for a 2010 release.

=== The Triumph (2010–2011) ===
The results from the 2008 session and the mixing, editing and production of 2009 became the band's fifth studio album, The Triumph of The 16 Deadly Improvs. Keith Smerak once again provided the exclusive artwork and design from his E6 studio.

In the words of the band the new album "reveals a more accessible side to The 16 Deadly Improvs that continues to explore our signature experimental, progressive rock edge, while venturing into darker and tension-filled territories."

The Triumph was released on July 15, 2010.

Since its release, The Triumph has garnered critical acclaim from around the globe. Pete Pardo from Sea of Tranquility.org called The Triumph "a unique and adventurous album from a band that deserves your immediate attention."

Rich Quinlan of Jersey Beat magazine said "This is the kind of album that needs to be heard in one sitting to be fully appreciated, as it is an intriguing compilation of genius. The Triumph of the 16 Deadly Improvs is complicated, challenging, and much cooler than whatever your band is doing right now. Go find and prepare to be amazed.

Furthermore, Italian indie magazine Losing Today commented "the result is a disc that intrigues and fascinates, confirming that even today, the year of grace 2010, a certain 'genre' manages to be more timely than ever." German site babyblaue-seiten.de gave the recording high marks, calling The Triumph "an eerie and fascinating disc".

In October 2010, the band appeared on the compilation covermount CD in the UK Future Publishing magazine Classic Rock presents PROG, alongside such acts as Opeth and Dream Theater's James LaBrie. The song "Spirit Or Matter" was included on the CD. In the December 2010 issue, Sid Smith described The Triumph as "an inventive approach, yielding impressive results that are rarely less than spectacular"

April 2011 brought accolades from NYC indie publication The Deli Magazine which listed the band as one of the Top 300 New York City area independent artists.

=== The Legend (2024) ===
On the 29th of June, the band released their first album as a sextet in over 13 years titled "The Legend".

== Band members ==
- Mark Nowak – keyboards, vocals
- Nick Bohensky – guitar, keyboards
- Vin Villanueva – guitar
- Jeff Bridi – bass, vocals
- Dave Wilson – drums, percussion
- Gene Bohensky – drums, keyboards

== Discography ==
- The 16 Deadly Improvs (1995)
- The Return of the 16 Deadly Improvs (2005)
- The Challenge of the 16 Deadly Improvs (2006)
- The Revenge of the 16 Deadly Improvs (2008)
- The Triumph of the 16 Deadly Improvs (2010)
- "Quartet: January 2009 (2017)"
- "Quartet: January 2010 (2017)"
- "Quartet: February 2010 (2017)"
- The Legend of the 16 Deadly Improvs (2024)
