= More Dark Than Shark =

1986 book by Brian Eno and Russell Mills

- Author: Brian Eno and Russell Mills
- Language: English
- Published: 1986
- Publisher: Faber and Faber, Opal Records Ltd.
- ISBN: 0-571-13810-1

More Dark Than Shark is a 1986 book by Brian Eno and Russell Mills. It features the lyrics to Eno's songs, each accompanied by an artwork inspired by the song's lyrics by Mills. Most of the lyrics and artworks are accompanied by notes by Eno and Mills on the lyrics and the interpretation of them as used for the artwork.

== Overview ==
The book is arranged chronologically, with songs arranged according to the album on which they appeared. Each album forms a chapter and is introduced by a commentary by Rick Poynor, these commentaries are largely formed through interviews with Eno. The commentaries cover Eno and Mills's influences, working methods, biography and philosophies, and are illustrated with excerpts from Eno's working notebooks. The chapters – and the albums that they precede – are:

- The Prepared Observer (Here Come the Warm Jets);
- The Painted Score (Taking Tiger Mountain (By Strategy));
- The Dynamics of the System (Another Green World);
- The Hidden Intention (Before and After Science); and
- The Words I Receive (this last chapter accompanies various collaborative songs).

== Publishing history ==
The book was published by Faber and Faber, London, in association with Opal Records Ltd. It was issued concurrently with the compilation albums More Blank than Frank and Desert Island Selection.
