= Yr (album) =

Studio album by Steve Tibbetts
- Released: 1980
- Studio: Minneapolis, Minnesota
- Genre: Jazz, Vocal jazz, jazz-funk
- Length: 38:36
- Label: Frammis; ECM 1355 (1988)
- Producer: Steve Tibbetts

Steve Tibbetts chronology
| Steve Tibbetts (1977) | Yr (1980) | Northern Song (1981) |

Yr is the second album by American guitarist and composer Steve Tibbetts, originally released on the independent Minneapolis label Frammis Records in 1980, and rereleased by ECM in 1988. The sextet features bassist Bob Hughes and percussionists Marc Anderson, Steve Cochrane, Marcus Wise and Tim Weinhold.

== Reception ==
Professional ratings
Review scores
| Source | Rating |
|---|---|
| AllMusic | 4.5/5 stars |

The AllMusic review states simply, "A perfect study item in regards to recording techniques and musicality. Guitarist has no boundaries on this insistently creative set."

== Track listing ==
1. "Ur" - 4:43
2. "Sphexes" - 3:49
3. "Ten Years" - 7:45
4. "One Day" - 2:22
5. "Three Primates" - 5:07
6. "You and It" - 7:20
7. "The Alien Lounge" - 3:42
8. "Ten Yr Dance" - 3:20

== Personnel ==
- Steve Tibbetts – guitars, kalimba, synthesizer
- Marc Anderson – congas, drums, percussion
- Bob Hughes – bass
- Steve Cochrane – tabla
- Marcus Wise – tabla
- Tim Weinhold – bongos, vase, bells
