= The First Day (David Sylvian and Robert Fripp album) =

Studio album by David Sylvian and Robert Fripp
- Released: 5 July 1993
- Recorded: December 1992 – March 1993
- Studios: Dreamland, Hurley, New York; Kingsway Studios, New Orleans, Louisiana
- Genres: Art rock, experimental rock
- Length: 63:15
- Label: Virgin
- Producers: David Sylvian, David Bottrill

David Sylvian chronology
Ember Glance: The Permanence of Memory (1991)	The First Day (1993)	Darshan (The Road To Graceland) (1993)

Professional ratings
Review scores
Source	Rating
AllMusic	4.5/5 stars
Encyclopedia of Popular Music	3/5 stars

The First Day is an album by the British musicians David Sylvian and Robert Fripp released in July 1993. The album, first of three collaborations between the two musicians, contains music merging elements of rock and funk.

After scattered collaborations from the late 1980s, Fripp asked Sylvian to join a new version of his band King Crimson, but Sylvian proposed a collaborative album.

All vocals and guitar parts were recorded at Kingsway in New Orleans, and the mixing was carried out at Electric Ladyland in New York with the help of Peter Gabriel's engineer David Bottrill. They also recorded in Woodstock. Chapman stick player Trey Gunn provided a foundation for Fripp to experiment on electric guitar. Percussion duties were filled by Marc Anderson (longtime collaborator with Steve Tibbetts) and Jerry Marotta (drummer for Peter Gabriel and Tony Levin), while co-producer David Bottrill provided percussion treatments and samples.

The First Day was released in three versions: a double LP (V2712), a regular CD (CDV 2712) and a box set with eight photo prints (CDVX 2712).

The second track of the album "Jean the Birdman" was released as a single, featuring exclusive B-sides.

== Background ==
In a 1994 interview Sylvian said about the album:

"That was at Robert [Fripp]'s instigation. It was at a time when I think I would have fallen silent anyway. I had no desire to work at that period in time, and Robert was really tugging at my sleeve saying, 'Let's do something, let's do something,' so… why not? And so that was an interesting journey in itself, and we worked together for a number of years before calling it quits. And then I was able to return to solo work…"

"Making this album was definitely a cathartic experience, both for Robert and myself. It comes out of traumatic experiences, but it also resolves them. In the end healing takes place. In working on this album I really surfaced from the experiences of the previous years and managed to move on. It was a turning point for both of us."

"Robert approached me in late 1991 about whether I wanted to join a new King Crimson he was forming. Though very flattered, I decided that I didn’t feel equipped to take on the whole baggage and history that comes with being a member of King Crimson. So instead we took the offer of the tour as an opportunity to write material for an album."

"In the end, three pieces were directly culled from live-performances, ’Jean The Birdman’, ’Firepower’ and ’20th Century Dreaming’, although the latter two were greatly extended and transformed in the studio. Once we had recorded these three pieces, we faced the choice of adding some ballads or making a more dynamic album. We decided that the album should be more confrontational, so we put the quieter pieces aside for the time being, and will maybe record them on a second joint album."

"Neither of us had thought of putting on a piece like ’Darshan’, which is 18 minutes of rhythmically repetitive music with jazz-type improvisations going on throughout. So there was a lot of re-structuring going on in that piece, whilst at the same time I tried not to weaken the live performance that gave it its power in the first place. It was a way of combining Robert’s and my approach to recording music, and a challenge that I enjoyed."

== Track listing ==
All lyrics are written by David Sylvian; all music is composed by Sylvian, Robert Fripp and Trey Gunn, except where noted.

No.	Title	Music	Length
1.	"God's Monkey"	Fripp, Gunn, Sylvian, David Bottrill	4:58
2.	"Jean the Birdman"		4:09
3.	"Firepower"		10:25
4.	"Brightness Falls"		6:05
5.	"20th Century Dreaming (A Shaman's Song)"		11:50
6.	"Darshan (The Road to Graceland)"	Fripp, Gunn, Sylvian, Bottrill	17:17
7.	"Bringing Down the Light"	Fripp	8:31
Total length:			63:15

== Personnel and production ==
- David Sylvian – vocals, guitars, keyboard instruments, tapes
- Robert Fripp – guitar, Frippertronics
- Trey Gunn – chapman stick, vocals
- Jerry Marotta – drums, percussion instruments
- Marc Anderson – percussion
- David Bottrill – treatments, sampled percussion, computer programming, engineer
- Ingrid Chavez – vocals

== Additional personnel ==
- Richard Chadwick – recording co-ordination
- Natasha White – recording co-ordination assistant
- Dan McLoughlin, John Yates, Mark Glass, Trina Shoemaker – assistant engineers
- Catherine McRae – design co-ordination
- Kevin Westenberg – photography
- Dave Coppenhall, Vaughan Oliver – design
- John Sinks – technical and strategic Liaison
