= Alchemy: An Index of Possibilities =

Compilation album by David Sylvian
- Released: 9 December 1985
- Genres: Electronic; ambient; world music
- Length: 36:41
- Label: Virgin
- Producers: David Sylvian; Nigel Walker

David Sylvian chronology
Brilliant Trees (1984)	Alchemy: An Index of Possibilities (1985)	Gone to Earth (1986)

Alternative cover
- Original cassette cover art

Professional ratings
Review scores
Source	Rating
AllMusic	3.5/5 stars
Encyclopedia of Popular Music	2/5 stars
Mojo	3/5 stars
Pitchfork	6.6/10
Uncut	2/5 stars

Alchemy: An Index of Possibilities is a collection of instrumentals by David Sylvian, first released in December 1985 on cassette-only as a limited edition, accompanying the instrumental suite Words With The Shaman, a 12" Ep released as a stop-gap between his first solo album Brilliant Trees and his next solo album Gone to Earth released in 1986.

It was re-issued in its original form on CD in Japan in 1991. Additionally, subsequent versions were released. First in the 1989 boxset Weatherbox, and a remastered version in 2003, both of which added tracks from separate projects (mainly b side material from the Pop Song EP, thus somewhat adding to the release not being a singular distinct album.

== History ==
The opening suite "Words with the Shaman" was simultaneously issued as a 12" EP, while "Steel Cathedrals" was used in a short film by Sylvian and Yasayuki Yamaguchi, shot in Tokyo, Japan, and released on VHS. The soundtrack features the voice of Jean Cocteau.

The track “Preparations for a Journey” is from a Japanese documentary of the same name, aired on Japanese television in February 1985 and made of interview footage, documenting Sylvian's interest in polaroid photography, filmed in different locations around Kyoto.

In 1989, the material from the original cassette-only limited edition was expanded with two additional instrumental tracks: "A Brief Conversation Ending in Divorce" and "The Stigma of Childhood (Kin)", the latter originally recorded for Gaby Agis's dance piece, Kin; premiered 8 September 1987 at Almeida Theatre in London. Both pieces were originally released in 1989 on the Pop Song EP. Compiled on a CD, it was then added as bonus material to the box set Weatherbox, a five-CD limited-edition set comprising Sylvian's solo albums released between 1984 and 1987.

In 2003, the 1989 Alchemy compilation was remastered and given for the first time a stand-alone release on CD, using the original artwork from the 12" instrumental single "Words with the Shaman", a painting by Amanda Faulkner.

In February 2019, as part of a redesigned monochrome sleeved vinyl reissue batch of his 80s albums, Alchemy - An Index of Possibilities was released with an earlier b/w photograph of Sylvian instead of the original artwork. No new mastering was done for this; the 2003 remaster was used instead, excluding the instrumental tracks from the Pop Song EP. This was the first official release of the 1985 compilation on vinyl, save for a quickly withdrawn Australian pressing in the 80s.

== Background ==
Sylvian was approached by a TV company in 1984 to make a documentary about himself. "The idea didn’t appeal to me particularly but I was extremely short of money", he said in 1984. So he did it, but “stretched the idea” to include sections of music and imagery. It was all made in a rush, but Sylvian liked one part, which became “Steel Cathedrals”: images of industrial buildings around Tokyo, shimmering and heaving with life, accompanied by a Sylvian/Sakamoto improvisation and all done in 48 hours.

So he brought that back to London with him and began reworking the music. He wanted to release it as a video, but felt he should record some more music to give Virgin the possibility of releasing an LP. That led to “Words With The Shaman” – originally one long work but cut into three because it had "begun to over-reach itself … it sounded too much of a grand statement."

“Words With the Shaman”, meanwhile, surfaced as an EP, and a cassette, ”Alchemy – An Index of Possibilities”, was released containing the music from both that and the video.

== Track listing ==
Original cassette and Japanese CD pressings

All tracks are written by David Sylvian and Jon Hassell, except as noted.

Side A
No.	Title	Writer(s)	Length
1.	"Words with the Shaman: Pt. 1 Ancient Evening"		5:11
2.	"Words with the Shaman: Pt.2 Incantation"		3:30
3.	"Words with the Shaman: Pt.3 Awakening – Songs from the Treetops"	Sylvian, Hassell, Steve Jansen	5:21
4.	"Preparations for a Journey"	Sylvian	3:40
Total length:			17:42

Side B
No.	Title	Writer(s)	Length
1.	"Steel Cathedrals" (Soundtrack from the Short Film by D. Sylvian and Y. Yamaguchi)	Sylvian, Ryuichi Sakamoto	18:55
Total length:			18:55

Weatherbox and 2003 CD pressings

No.	Title	Writer(s)	Length
1.	"Words with the Shaman: Pt. 1 Ancient Evening"		5:11
2.	"Words with the Shaman: Pt.2 Incantation"		3:30
3.	"Words with the Shaman: Pt.3 Awakening – Songs from the Treetops"	Sylvian, Hassell, Steve Jansen	5:21
4.	"Preparations for a Journey" (omitted from Weatherbox pressing)	Sylvian	3:40
5.	"The Stigma Of Childhood (Kin)"	Sylvian	8:30
6.	"A Brief Conversation Ending in Divorce"	Sylvian	3:30
7.	"Steel Cathedrals" (Soundtrack from the Short Film by D. Sylvian and Y. Yamaguchi)	Sylvian, Ryuichi Sakamoto	18:55
Total length:			48:37

== Personnel ==
"Words with the Shaman": (Produced by David Sylvian and Nigel Walker) Recorded in London 1985.

- David Sylvian – keyboards, guitars, tapes
- Steve Jansen – drums, percussion, additional keyboards
- Jon Hassell – trumpet
- Holger Czukay – radio, dictaphone
- Percy Jones – fretless bass

"Preparations For A Journey" (Produced by David Sylvian) Recorded in Tokyo 1984.

- Performed by David Sylvian

"Steel Cathedrals": (Produced by David Sylvian) Recorded in Tokyo 1984 and London 1985.

- David Sylvian – keyboards, tapes, digital percussion
- Ryuichi Sakamoto – piano, strings
- Steve Jansen – percussion
- Kenny Wheeler – flugelhorn
- Robert Fripp – guitar
- Holger Czukay – dictaphone
- Masami Tsuchiya – "guitar abstractions"

"A Brief Conversation Ending in Divorce": (Produced by David Sylvian and Steve Nye) Recorded 1989.

- David Sylvian – guitars, synthesisers, keyboard programming
- John Taylor – piano
- Stuart Bruce – computer programming

"The Stigma of Childhood (Kin)"(Produced by David Sylvian) Recorded 1987 at home. The track was originally recorded for the Gaby Agis performance "Kin", premiered 8 September 1987 at Almeida Theatre in London.

- Performed by David Sylvian.
