= Let the Happiness In =

Single by David Sylvian

from the album Secrets of the Beehive
- B-side: "Blue of Noon"/"Buoy" (remix)
- Released: 28 September 1987
- Recorded: 1987, London and Bath, England; Chateau Miraval, Le Val, France; Wisseloord Studios, Hilversum, The Netherlands
- Genre: Art rock
- Length: 5:37
- Label: Virgin
- Songwriter: David Sylvian
- Producers: Steve Nye, David Sylvian

David Sylvian singles chronology
"Silver Moon" (1986)	"Let the Happiness In" (1987)	"Orpheus" (1988)

"Let the Happiness In" is a song by the English singer-songwriter David Sylvian. It is the first single from his 1987 album Secrets of the Beehive. The instrumental B-side "Blue of Noon" was an unfinished outtake recorded during the Brilliant Trees sessions.

== Background ==
David Sylvian said about the B-side track "Blue of Noon": "Blue of Noon was never a finished piece as far as I was concerned (it was originally a song in fact). I felt it needed work to help it stand on its own feet." Steve Jansen commented: "Yes it was recorded in Berlin during Brilliant Trees sessions. It was a live recording, we played the track a number of times and this was the best take. Wayne (bass) may have dropped in for a line here or there once the drums and piano were recorded."

In their review of "Let the Happiness In", Music Week wrote that the song had a "haunting, blue mood" and was "characteristically atmospheric stuff from David Sylvian".

== Formats and track listing ==
All songs written by David Sylvian

European 7" single (VS 1001)

1. "Let The Happiness In" – 5:30
2. "Blue Of Noon" – 5:39

European 12" single (VST 1001)

1. "Let The Happiness In" – 5:30
2. "Blue Of Noon" – 5:39
3. "Buoy (remix)" – 5:54

== B-Sides ==
Credits 'Blue of Noon':

- Ryuichi Sakamoto: piano, synths
- Wayne Braithwaite: double bass
- Steve Jansen: drums
- Produced by David Sylvian and Steve Nye
- Mixed by Nigel Walker.

Credits 'Buoy (Remix)':

Written by Mick Karn, Original version taken from Mick Karn's solo album Dreams of Reason Produce Monsters, released in 1987.

- Mick Karn: bass, saxophone, dida, synthesiser, backing vocals
- Steve Jansen: drums, synthesiser, backing vocals
- David Sylvian: vocals
- Produced by Karn and Jansen
- Remix by Sylvian and Nigel Walker

== Chart performance ==
Chart (1987)	Peak position
UK Singles Chart	66
