= Gone to Earth (David Sylvian album) =

Studio album by David Sylvian
- Released: 1 September 1986
- Recorded: 1985–1986
- Studios: London; Oxfordshire
- Genres: Art rock; electronic; ambient; ambient pop; art pop
- Length: 80:27
- Label: Virgin
- Producers: Steve Nye; David Sylvian

David Sylvian chronology
Alchemy: An Index of Possibilities (1985)	Gone to Earth (1986)	Secrets of the Beehive (1987)

Singles from Gone to Earth
- 1. "Taking the Veil" Released: 28 July 1986; 2. "Silver Moon" Released: 22 September 1986

Alternative cover

Gone to Earth is the second solo studio album by English singer-songwriter David Sylvian, released on 1 September 1986 on Virgin Records. A double album, Gone to Earth is the follow-up to his debut record, Brilliant Trees, and peaked at No. 24 in the UK Albums Chart.

== History ==
The album is a two-record set featuring one record of experimental rock songs with vocals and one consisting entirely of ambient instrumental tracks. Guest artists include Robert Fripp (who co-wrote three songs) and Bill Nelson (who co-wrote one). The album was recorded through 1985 and mid-1986 at Jam Studios in North London, Eel Pie Studios and at The Manor Studios in Oxfordshire, England, with producer Steve Nye. Sylvian said in 1987: "I'd have liked to have recorded it all at Shipton Manor but we ran out of studio time. The rest of the album was done in Townhouse Studios, London. I find that most of the work that was completed in London was substandard compared to the work that was completed in Oxfordshire."

Initially, Sylvian started on a variety of different musical projects that didn't have a specific direction. He composed the film soundtrack Steel Cathedrals and the work Words with the Shaman, and worked on the songs "Wave", "Before The Bullfight" and "Laughter And Forgetting", that added up to a body of work that he felt was an incoherent collection of material. He persuaded Virgin Records to release Words with the Shaman as a 12" EP, and Steel Cathedrals was put aside for a video release only. Sylvian then concentrated on the songs he was working on with the intention to develop them and flesh it out to a full album. At the time, he was also writing short instrumental pieces and wanted to pursue them as well. Sylvian's record company were not particularly interested in his instrumental compositions, and funded the recording only of the songs on Disc 1 of the set, with Sylvian funding and recording the instrumentals on Disc 2 in his own time.

Sylvian, as on his earlier solo albums, continued to reference artists, writers and thinkers who were influencing him, though here he utilised the technique of using, within certain songs, snippets of the voices of particular figures. These include Robert Graves, who recites his entire five-stanza poem "The Foreboding," J. G. Bennett, and Joseph Beuys. (Presumably by mistake, the liner notes to the original CD omit reference to Robert Graves.) "Taking the Veil" lifted its title and lyrical theme directly from Max Ernst book "A Little Girl Dreams of Taking the Veil". The song "Laughter and Forgetting" was partly inspired by Milan Kundera's novel The Book of Laughter and Forgetting.

Recording his compositions, Sylvian collaborated with a number of musicians such as guitarists Robert Fripp and Bill Nelson, his brother Steve Jansen and Richard Barbieri from his earlier band Japan, jazz pianist John Taylor, bassist Jennifer Maidman, Kenny Wheeler and Harry Beckett on flugelhorns, saxophonist Mel Collins and pedal steel guitarist B.J. Cole.

Initially Sylvian pushed for "River Man" as the album's lead single, but Virgin Records opted for the more uptempo "Taking the Veil". It reached no. 53 on the UK Singles Chart during a four week chart run. The album was released on 1 September 1986 to critical acclaim and peaked at no. 24 in the UK albums chart. and has been certified Silver by the British Phonographic Industry for sales in excess of 60,000 copies. "Silver Moon" was released as the second and last single from the album, briefly entering the UK chart for two weeks, peaking at no. 83 in October 1986. The original cover art by Russell Mills was largely inspired by Sylvian's then-current interest in Rosicrucianism and Gnosticism, particularly the writings of Robert Fludd.

Original UK, US and Japanese CD pressings omit four of the instrumentals: "Silver Moon Over Sleeping Steeples", "Camp Fire: Coyote Country", "A Bird of Prey Vanishes into a Bright Blue Cloudless Sky" and "Sunlight Seen Through Towering Trees". Later Japanese CD editions and the Weatherbox box set both included the complete album on two discs. In 2003, the album was re-released in a double-disc format that mirrors the original vinyl release, and included three bonus remixes, while shortening the intro to "Before the Bullfight".

In February 2019, as part of a redesigned monochrome sleeved vinyl reissue batch of his 1980s material, Gone To Earth was released as a double album with a black-and-white picture of Sylvian replacing the original artwork.

== Critical reception ==
Professional ratings
Review scores
Source	Rating
AllMusic	3.5/5 stars
Encyclopedia of Popular Music	3/5 stars
Mojo	3/5 stars
Pitchfork	8.3/10
Record Mirror	4/5 stars
Smash Hits	3/10
Uncut	2/5 stars

Gone to Earth was well received by the contemporary British music press. Sounds' Chris Roberts praised the album: "it's the perfect realisation of artist converting image to mood, subverting fantasy to super-reality. Delicate, but with the strength of legions, it's an Eighties masterpiece and conceivably his finest approximation of distilled beauty ever... [Gone to Earth] is almost as breathtaking as it is life giving."

== Track listing ==
Original vinyl and Weatherbox CD pressings

All tracks are written by David Sylvian, except as noted.

Side A
No.	Title	Writer(s)	Length
1.	"Taking the Veil"		4:40
2.	"Laughter and Forgetting"		2:40
3.	"Before the Bullfight"		9:45
4.	"Gone to Earth"	Robert Fripp, Sylvian	3:06
Total length:			20:11

Side B
No.	Title	Length
1.	"Wave"	9:11
2.	"River Man"	4:54
3.	"Silver Moon"	6:19
Total length:		20:24

Side C
No.	Title	Writer(s)	Length
1.	"The Healing Place"		5:34
2.	"Answered Prayers"	Bill Nelson, Sylvian	3:10
3.	"Where the Railroad Meets the Sea"		2:52
4.	"The Wooden Cross"		5:04
5.	"Silver Moon Over Sleeping Steeples"		2:22
Total length:			19:02

Side D
No.	Title	Writer(s)	Length
1.	"Camp Fire : Coyote Country"	Fripp, Sylvian	3:51
2.	"A Bird of Prey Vanishes into a Bright Blue Cloudless Sky"		3:16
3.	"Home"		4:33
4.	"Sunlight Seen Through Towering Trees"		3:02
5.	"Upon This Earth"	Fripp, Sylvian	6:30
Total length:			21:12

For Weatherbox, Disc 1 included sides A and B, while Disc 2 included sides C and D.

Original CD pressing

No.	Title	Writer(s)	Length
1.	"Taking the Veil"		4:40
2.	"Laughter and Forgetting"		2:40
3.	"Before the Bullfight"		9:45
4.	"Gone to Earth"	Robert Fripp, Sylvian	3:06
5.	"Wave"		9:11
6.	"River Man"		4:54
7.	"Silver Moon"		6:19
8.	"The Healing Place"		5:34
9.	"Answered Prayers"	Bill Nelson, Sylvian	3:10
10.	"Where the Railroad Meets the Sea"		2:52
11.	"The Wooden Cross"		5:04
12.	"Home"		4:33
13.	"Upon This Earth"	Fripp, Sylvian	6:30
Total length:			68:18

2003 CD pressing

All tracks are written by David Sylvian, except as noted.

Disc 1
No.	Title	Writer(s)	Length
1.	"Taking the Veil"		4:40
2.	"Laughter and Forgetting"		2:41
3.	"Before the Bullfight"		9:21
4.	"Gone to Earth"	Robert Fripp, Sylvian	3:06
5.	"Wave"		9:11
6.	"River Man"		4:54
7.	"Silver Moon"		6:19
8.	"River Man" (Remix)		4:24
9.	"Gone to Earth" (Remix)	Robert Fripp, Sylvian	1:56
10.	"Camp Fire : Coyote Country" (Remix)	Fripp, Sylvian	3:46
Total length:			50:53

Disc Two
No.	Title	Writer(s)	Length
1.	"The Healing Place"		5:34
2.	"Answered Prayers"	Bill Nelson, Sylvian	3:10
3.	"Where the Railroad Meets the Sea"		2:52
4.	"The Wooden Cross"		5:04
5.	"Silver Moon Over Sleeping Steeples"		2:22
6.	"Camp Fire : Coyote Country"	Fripp, Sylvian	3:51
7.	"A Bird of Prey Vanishes into a Bright Blue Cloudless Sky"		3:16
8.	"Home"		4:33
9.	"Sunlight Seen Through Towering Trees"		3:02
10.	"Upon This Earth"	Fripp, Sylvian	6:30
Total length:			40:14

== Personnel ==
Musicians

- David Sylvian – lead vocals, keyboards (A1, A3, B1, B2, B3), guitar (A1, A3, A4, B2), electronics (A1, A2)
- Robert Fripp – guitar (A1, A4, B1, B2, B3, D1, D5), Frippertronics (A4, B1, B2, B3)
- Steve Jansen – drums (A1, A3, B1, B2, B3)
- Phil Palmer – acoustic guitar (A1)
- Jennifer Maidman – bass (A1, B2, B3)
- Kenny Wheeler – flugelhorn (A2, A3)
- John Taylor – piano (A2)
- Bill Nelson – guitar (A3, B1, B3, C1, C2, D4)
- Richard Barbieri – electronics (A3, B1)
- Harry Beckett – flugelhorn (B1)
- Mel Collins – soprano saxophone (B2, B3)
- B.J. Cole – pedal steel guitar (B3, C5)
- Joseph Beuys – voice (C1)
- John G. Bennett – voice (A4)
- Robert Graves – voice (D5)

Technical

- Russell Mills – design
- David Buckland – photography
- Steve Nye – engineer, piano (C3)
- Nick Blundell – assistant engineer
- Julian Wheatley – assistant engineer
- Noel Haris – assistant engineer
- Catherine Wilson – assistant engineer
- Yuka Fujii – special thanks

== Charts ==
Chart (1986)	Peak position
Australian Albums (Kent Music Report)	94
Dutch Albums (Album Top 100)	6
Japanese Albums (Oricon)	52
New Zealand Albums (RMNZ)	46
Swedish Albums (Sverigetopplistan)	30
UK Albums (Official Charts)	24
