= Steve Tibbetts (album) =

Studio album by Steve Tibbetts
- Released: 1976 (self)
- Recorded: 1976
- Studio: Der Studio D'Muzak Elechtronik, St. Paul, Minnesota
- Genre: jazz
- Length: 34:23
- Label: Frammis

Steve Tibbetts chronology
Steve Tibbetts (1976)	Yr (1980)

Professional ratings
Review scores
Source	Rating
AllMusic	4/5 stars
The New Rolling Stone Record Guide	3/5 stars

Steve Tibbetts is the debut album by Steve Tibbetts, recorded in 1976. Eventually released by Frammis Records in 1979, the CD was reissued by Cuneiform in 1995.

== Critical reception ==
The New Rolling Stone Record Guide wrote that Tibbets "uses a few too many cliches, [but] proves that he has the talent to make those cliches work." The Billboard Guide to Progressive Music called the album "a classic of instrumental psychedelic progressive music from the unlikely region of grassroots middle America."

== Track listing ==
All songs written by Steve Tibbetts

1. "Sunrise" - 4:14
2. "The Secret" - 4:49
3. "Desert" - 4:39
4. "The Wonderful Day" - 2:20
5. "Gong" - 1:43
6. "Jungle Rhythm" - 5:37
7. "Interlude" - 1:52
8. "Alvin Goes to Tibet" - 4:16
9. "How Do You Like My Buddha?" - 5:06

== Personnel ==
- Steve Tibbetts - Instruments, tape effects, vocals and engineering
- Tim Weinhold - percussion
- First released on Frammis Records 1977
- Photo by Walter Goldstein
- Art by Frammis

Reissue

- CD Mastering by SAE Digital Mastering
- CD Graphic Production by Paula Millett
- Reissue coordination by Steve Feigenbaum
