= I Surrender (David Sylvian song) =

Single by David Sylvian

from the album Dead Bees on a Cake
- B-side: "Les Fleurs du Mal"/"Starred and Dreaming"
- Released: 15 March 1999
- Recorded: 1999 at Right Track Studios in New York City, NY
- Genre: Art rock
- Length: 9:24
- Label: Virgin
- Songwriter(s): David Sylvian
- Producer(s): David Sylvian

David Sylvian singles chronology
"Jean the Birdman" (1993)	"I Surrender" (1999)	"Godman" (1999)

"I Surrender" is a song by the English singer-songwriter David Sylvian. It is the first single from his 1999 album Dead Bees on a Cake.

== Chart positions ==
Chart (1999)	Peak position
UK Singles Chart	40
