= Pulling Punches =

Single by David Sylvian

from the album Brilliant Trees
- B-side: "Backwaters" (remix)
- Released: 22 October 1984
- Recorded: 1983–1984
- Studio: London; Berlin
- Genre: Art rock; funk rock
- Length: 5:02
- Label: Virgin
- Songwriter(s): David Sylvian
- Producer(s): Steve Nye; David Sylvian

David Sylvian singles chronology
"The Ink in the Well" (1984)	"Pulling Punches" (1984)	"Words with the Shaman" (1985)

Music video
- "Pulling Punches" on YouTube

"Pulling Punches" is a song by the English singer-songwriter David Sylvian. It was released on 22 October 1984 by Virgin Records as the third single from his debut solo studio album Brilliant Trees. The single peaked at No. 56 on the UK singles chart.

== Critical reception ==
In Sylvian's 2012 biography by Martin Power, the song was described as "a jarring, and at times barbed funk work-out".

== Track listings ==
7"

1. "Pulling Punches" – 3:02
2. "Backwaters" – 4:49

12"

1. "Pulling Punches" – 5:01
2. "Backwaters" – 4:49

== Chart positions ==
Chart (1984)	Peak position
UK Singles (OCC)	56
