= Secrets of the Beehive =

Studio album by David Sylvian
- Released: 26 October 1987
- Recorded: 1987
- Studios: Château Miraval, Correns, France; Angel Studios and AIR Studios, London; Wisseloord Studios, Hilversum, The Netherlands; The Wool House, Bath, England
- Genres: Art rock; chamber rock
- Length: 34:30 original LP; 40:31 CD reissue 43:59 Japanese CD
- Label: Virgin
- Producers: Steve Nye; David Sylvian

David Sylvian chronology
Gone to Earth (1986)	Secrets of the Beehive (1987)	Plight & Premonition (1988)

Singles from Secrets of the Beehive
- 1. "Let the Happiness In" Released: 28 September 1987; 2. "Orpheus" Released: 3 May 1988

Secrets of the Beehive is the third studio album, and fourth album overall, by the English musician David Sylvian. The album was released on 26 October 1987 in Europe and the United States, and in Japan on 21 November 1987. The album peaked at number 37 on the UK album chart. Sylvian has stated that the album's title is a reference to the beehive representing the concept of an ideal society or hierarchy, and that many of his songs explored the desire to be part of a society, but not being able to fit in.

== Background and composition ==
Following the release of his previous album Gone to Earth in September 1986, Sylvian embarked on a worldwide press tour to publicise the album. He was accompanied by his then girlfriend, the photographer and visual artist Yuka Fujii, who encouraged Sylvian to listen to jazz music, particularly from the ECM Records label, during the tour.

Having returned to England after the press tour, Sylvian's intention was to recover from the trip and not return to writing immediately, but over a period of about two weeks he had written all the tracks that would become Secrets of the Beehive. Sylvian told Melody Maker, "This whole album was written instinctively; it wasn't premeditated in any way. For the first time each track was written in one sitting." In another interview with Sound on Sound magazine prior to the album's release, Sylvian disclosed that the album would feature shorter songs with traditional instrumentation, as opposed to the lengthy experimental and instrumental tracks that had dominated his previous two records. Sylvian later said that the lyrics on Secrets of the Beehive were more important and more straightforward than on his previous records, so he felt that it would be unnecessary to add too much orchestration and effects to the songs.

== Recording ==
Sylvian spent the early part of 1987 making demo tapes of the songs he had written. Recording of the album took place over two and a half months, starting at Château Miraval in the south of France, which was chosen by Sylvian because he felt it had an "exotic location". The various musicians that contributed to the album visited the Château to add their parts. Once the basic tracks were finished, Sylvian and his collaborator Ryuichi Sakamoto returned to London to record the orchestral arrangements at Angel Studios. Sakamoto scored the majority of the songs, except for "Orpheus" and "Let the Happiness In" which were scored by arranger Brian Gascoigne. Mark Isham also recorded his parts at Angel and AIR Studios. The recording process then moved to Wisseloord Studios at Hilversum in the Netherlands where Sylvian recorded his vocals, and overdubs were made. The album was completed and mixed at the Wool Hall in Bath by Steve Nye.

Although the final released version of Secrets of the Beehive was acclaimed by music critics, Sylvian ran out of time and budget and was unable to complete the album the way he envisioned it, and saw it as "something of a failure" because the "centrepiece" was missing. The missing piece was the song "Ride", which was later completed and finally released in 2000 on the compilation album Everything and Nothing. Sylvian told a Q&A session on his website, "I was crushed when I wasn't able to finish it first time around due to time and budget constraints."

== Releases ==
In 2003, a remastered limited digipak version of Secrets of the Beehive was released with the bonus track "Promise (The Cult of Eurydice)" from the Japanese version of the album replacing the original 1987 CD bonus track of a re-recorded version of "Forbidden Colours", which had been originally intended for inclusion on Brilliant Trees, but was eventually released as the B-side to the "Red Guitar" single. In 2006 it was reissued in a standard jewel-case.

In February 2019, as part of a redesigned monochrome sleeved vinyl reissue batch of Sylvian's 80s albums, Secrets of the Beehive was re-issued in a gatefold sleeve with different type fonts, but otherwise maintaining the original artwork.

== Critical reception ==
Professional ratings
Review scores
Source	Rating
AllMusic	4.5/5 stars
Encyclopedia of Popular Music	3/5 stars
Mojo	5/5 stars
New Musical Express	9/10
Pitchfork	9.1/10
Record Mirror	4.5/5 stars
Uncut	4/5 stars

Secrets of the Beehive appeared in October 1987 to universally positive reviews. Writing for the NME, Jack Barron said that "Sylvian's mannered style is so overpowering it tends to smother the depth of this record's content" and that "the whole weight of the world seems to be bearing down on his padded shoulders". However, he praised the "impeccably arranged" instrumentation and Sylvian's singing, and stated that "what emerges buzzes with all sorts of forgotten resonances", concluding that "Secrets of the Beehive is a fabulous and mercurial record." In Record Mirror, Betty Page wrote that "Secrets of the Beehive contains the most honest, direct set of tunes that [Sylvian] has ever written, stripped of the sort of pretension that previously made it difficult for certain people to take him seriously". She noted "[Sylvian's] voice now having an oddly compelling quality, the surrounding layers of acoustic guitar, percussion, strings and keyboard constructed with painstaking care", and said, "it's all very introspective (if a mite soporific at times) but beautifully melodic and mellow."

== Track listing ==
All tracks are written by David Sylvian, except as noted.

No.	Title	Length
1.	"September"	1:17
2.	"The Boy with the Gun"	5:19
3.	"Maria"	2:49
4.	"Orpheus"	4:51
5.	"The Devil's Own"	3:12
6.	"When Poets Dreamed of Angels"	4:51
7.	"Mother and Child"	3:15
8.	"Let the Happiness In"	5:37
9.	"Waterfront"	3:23
Total length:		34:34

Original 1987 CD bonus track
No.	Title	Writer(s)	Length
10.	"Forbidden Colours" (version)	Sylvian; Ryuichi Sakamoto	6:01

2003 CD bonus track
No.	Title	Length
10.	"Promise (The Cult of Eurydice)"	3:28

== Personnel ==
- David Sylvian – vocals, piano (1), acoustic guitar (2, 4, 6), organ (2, 8), synths (2, 3, 4, 5, 8, 10), tapes (3, 5), treated piano (5)
- Ryuichi Sakamoto – string arrangement (1, 2, 3, 6, 9, 10), organ (2, 3, 5, 7, 8), synths (2, 4, 8), piano (4, 5, 7, 9, 10), treated piano (3), woodwind arrangement (5), brass arrangement (8)
- Steve Jansen – drums (4, 8, 10)
- David Torn – electric guitar (2, 7), guitar loop (3)
- Danny Thompson – double bass (2, 4, 7)
- Danny Cummings – percussion (2, 6, 7, 8)
- Phil Palmer – slide guitar (4), acoustic guitars (6)
- Mark Isham – flugelhorn (4,8), trumpet (6, 8)
- Brian Gascoigne – orchestral arrangement (4), string arrangement (8)
- Ann O'Dell – string arrangement (10)

== Technical personnel ==
- Steve Nye – producer, mixing, engineer
- David Sylvian – assistant producer, assistant mixing
- Peter Williams – co-engineer (10)
- Richard Moakes – second engineer
- Steve Parker – second engineer
- John Timperley – second engineer
- Jean-Jacques Lemoine – assistant engineer
- Roland Prent – assistant engineer
- Steve Williams – assistant engineer
- Richard Chadwick – recording co-ordinating
- Catherine Wilson – assistant in recording
- Vaughan Oliver (23 Envelope) – design, typography
- Nigel Grierson (23 Envelope) – still life photography
- Yuka Fujii – portrait photography

== Charts ==
Chart (1987)	Peak position
Australian Albums (Kent Music Report)	91
Dutch Albums (Album Top 100)	31
Swedish Albums (Sverigetopplistan)	46
UK Albums (Official Charts)	37
