= Silver Moon (David Sylvian song) =

Single by David Sylvian

from the album Gone to Earth
- B-side: "Gone to Earth"; "Silver Moon Over Sleeping Steeples"
- Released: 22 September 1986
- Recorded: 1985–1986 in London and Oxfordshire
- Genre: Art rock; soft rock; new wave
- Length: 6:19
- Label: Virgin
- Songwriter(s): David Sylvian
- Producer(s): Steve Nye; David Sylvian

David Sylvian singles chronology
"Taking the Veil" (1986)	"Silver Moon" (1986)	"Let the Happiness In" (1987)

Music video
- "Silver Moon" on YouTube

"Silver Moon" is a song by the English singer-songwriter David Sylvian. It is the second single from his album Gone to Earth and was accompanied on release by a video directed by Nicholas Brandt (who would go on to become an esteemed wildlife photographer).

== Chart positions ==
Chart (1986)	Peak position
UK Singles Chart	83
