= Orpheus (David Sylvian song) =

Single by David Sylvian

from the album Secrets of the Beehive
- B-side: "Mother and Child"
- Released: 3 May 1988
- Recorded: 1987, London and Bath, England; Chateau Miraval, Le Val, France; Wisseloord Studios, Hilversum, The Netherlands
- Genre: Art rock
- Length: 4:46
- Label: Virgin
- Songwriter(s): David Sylvian
- Producer(s): Steve Nye, David Sylvian

David Sylvian singles chronology
"Let the Happiness In" (1987)	"Orpheus" (1988)	"Pop Song" (1989)

"Orpheus" is a song by the English singer-songwriter David Sylvian, released on 3 May 1988 as the second single from his fourth studio album Secrets of the Beehive (1987). The song evokes the myth of Orpheus.

== Formats and track listing ==
All songs written by David Sylvian

European 7" single (VS 1043)

1. "Orpheus" – 4:46
2. "Mother and Child" – 3:09

European 12" single (VST 1043)

1. "Orpheus" – 4:46
2. "Mother and Child" – 3:09
3. "The Devil's Own" – 3:08

== Personnel ==
- David Sylvian – vocals, acoustic guitar, synths
- Ryuichi Sakamoto – piano, synths
- Steve Jansen – drums
- Danny Thompson – double bass
- Phil Palmer – slide guitar
- Mark Isham – flugelhorn
- Brian Gascoigne – orchestral arrangement

== Accolades ==
Year	Publication	Country	Article	Rank
2005	Süddeutsche Zeitung	Germany	1020 Songs 1955–2005	*
2008	Luca Sofri	Italy	2,978 Songs You Can't Live Without	*
2017	Rumore	Italy	Top 300 Songs of All Time	96

(*) designates unordered lists.
