= Sabrina Ward Harrison =

Canadian artist and author (born 1975)

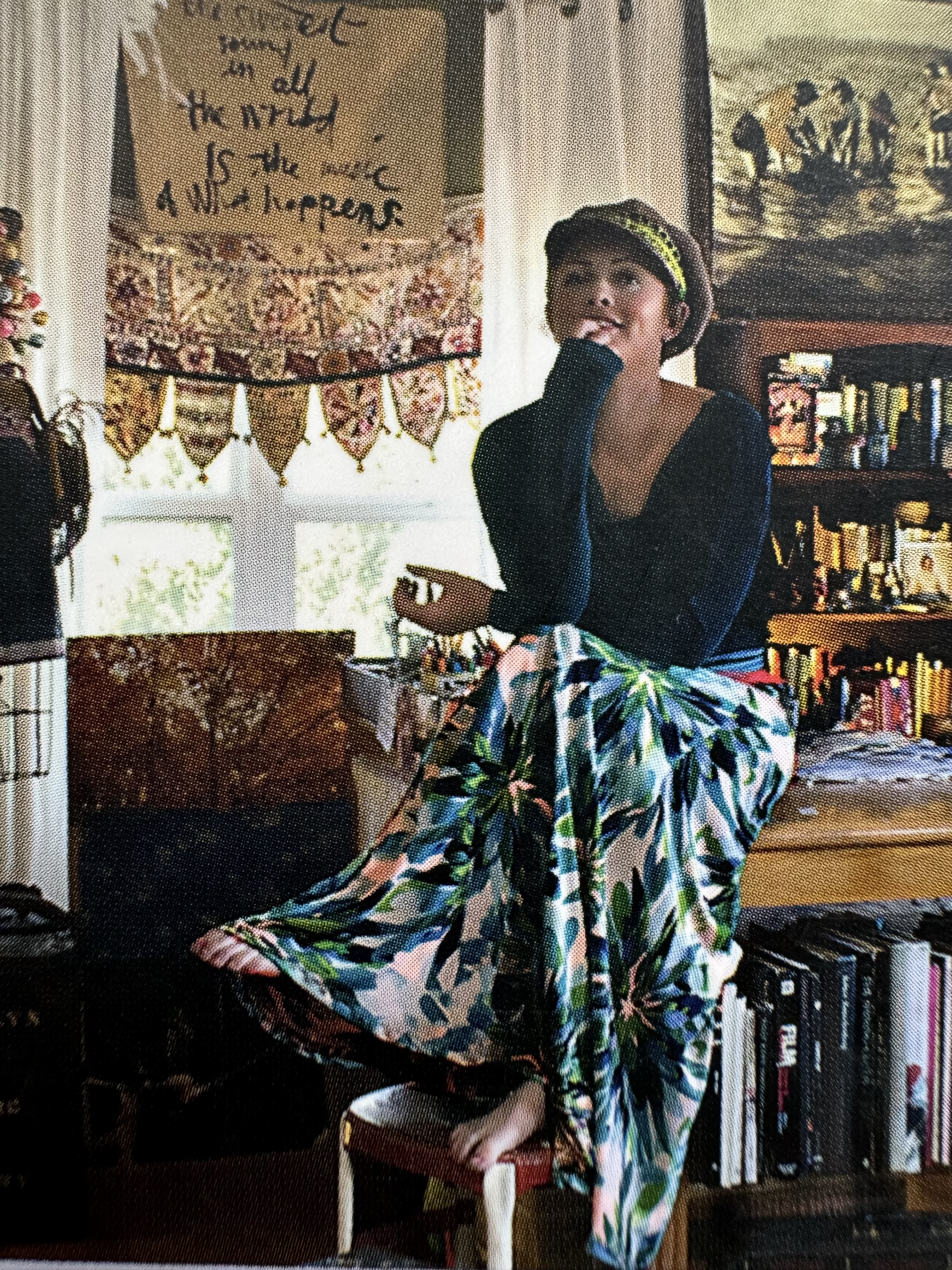
Sabrina Ward Harrison

Sabrina Ward Harrison (born December 2, 1975, Canada) is a Canadian artist and author.

Sabrina Ward Harrison is the creator of five published books based on her coming-of-age journals. The first book, Spilling Open; The Art of Becoming Yourself (Villard 1999), was published when Harrison was only 22. Her other books include Brave on the Rocks; If You Don't Go, You Don't See (Villard 2002), Messy Thrilling Life; The Art of Figuring Out How to Live (Villard 2004) and The True And the Questions; A Journal (Chronicle Books 2005).

Harrison currently lives in Madison, Wisconsin where she continues to run an online creativity course called Liberate.

== Works ==
- Spilling Open: The Art of Becoming Yourself, New World Library 1994, ISBN 978-1577310440
- Brave on the Rocks: If You Don't Go, You Don't See, Topeka Bindery 2001, ISBN 978-1-4177-0974-8
- Messy Thrilling Life: The Art of Figuring Out How to Live, Villard 2004, ISBN 978-0-8129-6766-1
- The True and the Questions: A Journal, Chronicle Books 2005, ISBN 978-0811848626
- And the Story Is Happening, Chronicle Books 2012, ISBN 978-1452106113
