= Taking the Veil =

Single by David Sylvian

from the album Gone to Earth
- B-side: "Taking the Veil" (remix); "Answered Prayers"; "A Bird of Prey Vanishes Into a Bright Blue Cloudless Sky"
- Released: 28 July 1986
- Recorded: 1985–1986 in London and Oxfordshire
- Genre: Art rock
- Length: 4:40
- Label: Virgin
- Songwriter: David Sylvian
- Producers: Steve Nye; David Sylvian

David Sylvian singles chronology
| "Words with the Shaman" (1985) | "Taking the Veil" (1986) | "Silver Moon" (1986) |

"Taking the Veil" is a song by the English singer-songwriter David Sylvian. It was the first single released in support of his 1986 album Gone to Earth.

The song's title was inspired by Sylvian's encounter with the Max Ernst collage novel A Little Girl Dreams of Taking the Veil. However, whereas Ernst's volume deals with various forms of angst undergone by its main character, the lyrics to Sylvian's song are much more positive.

== Chart positions ==
| Chart (1986) | Peak position |
|---|---|
| Irish Singles Chart | 28 |
| UK Singles Chart | 53 |
