= The Ink in the Well =

Single by David Sylvian

from the album Brilliant Trees
- B-side: "Weathered Wall" (Instrumental)
- Released: 6 August 1984
- Recorded: 1983–1984, London, Berlin
- Genre: Art rock
- Length: 4:30
- Label: Virgin
- Songwriter(s): David Sylvian
- Producer(s): Steve Nye; David Sylvian

David Sylvian singles chronology
"Red Guitar" (1984)	"The Ink in the Well" (1984)	"Pulling Punches" (1984)

Music video
- "The Ink in the Well" on YouTube

"The Ink in the Well" is a song by the English singer-songwriter David Sylvian. It was released in August 1984 as the second single from his debut solo album Brilliant Trees. The single peaked at No. 36 on the UK Singles Chart.

== Reception ==
Reviewing the song for Record Mirror, Eden wrote "Mention David Sylvian and the adjectives that immediately spring to mind are sensitive, delicate, moody. 'Ink in the Well' lives up to David's reputation, it's accomplished with endearing lyrics and an interesting jazzy interlude occurs halfway through the song".

== Themes ==
The song was inspired by Picasso's 1937 canvas Guernica.

== Personnel ==
On "The Ink in the Well":

- David Sylvian – vocals, synthesizers
- Phil Palmer – guitar
- Danny Thompson – double bass
- Kenny Wheeler – flugelhorn
- Steve Jansen – drums

On "Weathered Wall":

- David Sylvian – synthesizer
- Richard Barbieri – synthesizer
- Ryuichi Sakamoto – piano
- John Hassell – trumpet
- Holger Czukay – dictaphone
- Steve Jansen – drums, percussion

Technical:

- David Sylvian – cover design, remixing ("The Ink in the Well")
- Nigel Walker – remixing ("The Ink in the Well")
- Peter Williams – engineer
- Steve Nye – engineer, mixing
- Anton Corbijn – photography
- Yuka Fujii – photography

== Chart positions ==
Chart (1984)	Peak position
Ireland (IRMA)	28
UK Singles (OCC)	36
