= Pop Song (David Sylvian song) =

Single by David Sylvian
- B-side: "A Brief Conversation Ending in Divorce"/"The Stigma of Childhood (Kin)"
- Released: 30 October 1989
- Recorded: June 1989 in London, England
- Genre: Art rock
- Length: 4:30
- Label: Virgin
- Songwriter: David Sylvian
- Producers: Steve Nye, David Sylvian

David Sylvian singles chronology
"Orpheus" (1988)	"Pop Song" (1989)	"Heartbeat (Tainai Kaiki II)" (1992)

"Pop Song" is a song by the English singer-songwriter David Sylvian. The song was released in late 1989 as a non-album single concurrent with the release of the 1989 retrospective box set Weatherbox, though it did not appear on it. (A promo-only sampler released for the box set at the time did include it.) It made its initial official compilation appearance in 2000 on the Everything and Nothing album.

== Background ==
When the budget for the single was agreed, Simon Draper of Virgin Records was adamant that Sylvian had said he needed some studio time to record "a pop song". But Sylvian swore blind that he had said: "It’s called Pop Song. It is NOT 'A' pop song..."

Sylvian said about the song in 1989: "It’s a strange piece, a real one-off. A lot of different interests brought it into being. It rekindled the fascination I had when I went into music in the first place, and it got me working with synthesizers again. Lyrically, it's kind of playful, dealing with what I see in popular culture which is, basically, a waste of creative potential and a willingness on the part of the public to be a party to that, to a lost belief in popular culture more than their own lives.";"It frightens me that people depend so much on those vacant icons which give people nothing in return. 'Pop Song' doesn't delve too deeply into all this. It's playing the game, in a sense. Being subversive from within."

"Pop Song" was recorded at London's Marcus Studios at the end of the summer of 1989, with Steve Nye producing. "Pop Song" and its B-side "A Brief Conversation Ending in Divorce" were pretty much finished by the time pianist John Taylor came in.

Japan keyboardist Richard Barbieri said: "David did 'Pop Song' using the extrapolated tunings on the Roland D-50, where you can widen out the octave or bring the octave in. We started messing around with something like that on Tin Drum."

The two instrumental B-sides, "A Brief Conversation Ending In Divorce" and "The Stigma Of Childhood (Kin)" were later appended as bonus tracks on the remastered version of Sylvian's 1985 album Alchemy: An Index of Possibilities.

"The Stigma of Childhood (Kin)" was originally recorded for a dance piece Kin, by Gaby Agis, with set design by Kate Blacker and with music by David Sylvian. Kin was premiered at the Almeida Theatre, London 8–13 September 1987.

== Chart positions ==
Chart (1989)	Peak position
UK Singles Chart	83
