= Marc Anderson =

American poet

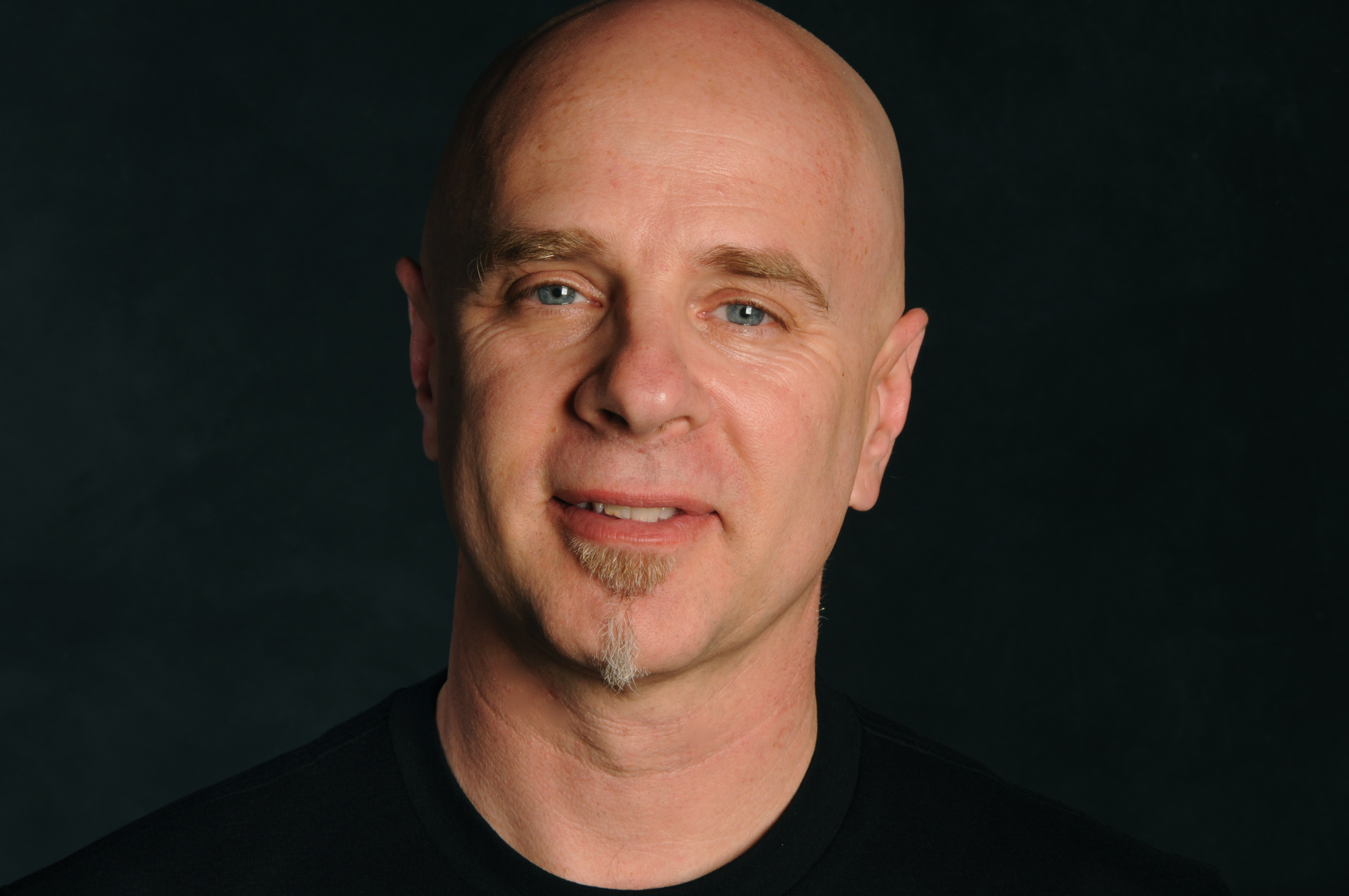

Background information
- Born: December 10, 1955 (age 70)
- Occupations: percussionist, composer, poet, Zen Buddhist priest
- Instrument: Percussion

Marc Dennis Anderson (born December 10, 1955) is an American born percussionist, composer, poet and Zen Buddhist priest. Best known for records and live performances with guitarist and composer Steve Tibbetts, he has recorded and performed with dozens of notable artists. His interests and studies in non-western instruments and musical traditions are a signature of his sound and technical style.

== Early life and education ==
Anderson was born in Austin, Minnesota, the son of Truman Anderson and Mary Lou Regner. He is the oldest of 5 children. He attended Austin Central High School and holds a degree in Cultural Anthropology from the University of Minnesota.

== Career ==
In 1977 Anderson met and began working with Steve Tibbetts who had just started working his second record. That record, titled YR, led to their first recording with the prestigious German record company ECM and legendary producer Manfred Eicher. In the fall of 1982 the two flew to Oslo, Norway and recorded Northern Song, the first of many recordings the pair would make over the next several decades. Through the 1980s and 1990s Anderson became a stalwart in the Twin Cities music community as a sideman and bandleader performing and recording in a wide range of musical and artistic environments including; free improvisation, traditional Irish, Ghanaian, Finnish and Americana folk music, experimental, avant-garde, jazz and pop. He also produced a number of records including two recordings as leader and composer: Time Fish and Ruby. He has toured extensively in the US, Europe and Asia. He was the founder of two Twin Cities musical groups: Eight head and Speaking In Tongues. His most recent musical project in called Music and Words. In the early 1980s he met Sowah Mensah, a musician and teacher from Ghana, launching a friendship and new musical direction. Anderson went on to study Ghanaian music with Mensah and with teachers in Ghana for many years. He has also studied Haitian ritual drumming.

== Zen priest ==
Anderson began doing transcendental meditation in 1983. Anderson runs a community based project called The Urban Monk Project.

== Select discography ==
=== As leader/composer/producer ===
- Time Fish - 1993
- Ruby - 2002
- Festival Africa - 2001
- World Music - 2002

=== With Steve Tibbetts ===
- Yr – 1980
- Northern Song – 1981
- Safe Journey – 1984
- Exploded View - 1986
- Big Map Idea – 1988
- The Fall Of Us All – 1994
- Cho (with Choying Drolma) – 1997
- A (with Knute Hamre) - 1998
- A Man About A Horse – 2002
- Selwa (with Choying Drolma) – 2004
- Natural Causes – 2010
- Life Of - 2018

=== As a sideman with ===
==== David Sylvian and Robert Fripp ====
- The First Day (1993)

==== Peter Ostroushko ====
- Heart of the Heartland – 1995
- Pilgrims On The Heart Road - 1997
- Sacred Heart - 2000
- Coming Down From Red Lodge – 2003
- Minnesota: A History Of The Land – 2005
- Heartland Holiday - 2005
- Postcards - 2006

==== Greg Brown ====
- One More Goodnight Kiss – 1988

==== Peter Mayer ====
- Million Year Mind (artist and producer) - 1999
- Bountiful (artist and producer) – 2000
- Elements (artist and producer) -2001
- Earth Town Square (artist and producer) -2003
- Midwinter – 2005
- Novelties - 2007

==== Claudia Schmidt ====
- It Looks Fine From Here – 1994

==== Ruth Mackenzie ====
- Kalevala: Dream Of The Salmon Maiden - 1998
