= Rain Tree Crow =

Studio album by Rain Tree Crow
- Released: 8 April 1991
- Recorded: September 1989 – April 1990
- Studios: Miraval, Correns, France; Condulmer, Zerman di Mogliano, Italy; Marcus, London; AIR, London, UK; The Wool Hall, Beckington, UK; Ropewalk, Dublin, Ireland; Mega Studios, Paris, France; Eel Pie, London, UK
- Genres: Experimental rock; ambient
- Length: 45:53
- Label: Virgin
- Producer: Rain Tree Crow

Japan chronology
Oil on Canvas (1983)	Rain Tree Crow (1991)

David Sylvian chronology
Weatherbox (1989)	Rain Tree Crow (1991)	Ember Glance: The Permanence of Memory (1991)

Singles from Rain Tree Crow
- 1. "Blackwater" Released: March 1991

Rain Tree Crow is the sole album released by English band Rain Tree Crow, a reunion project by the members of the new wave band Japan. Recorded in 1989 and 1990 and released in April 1991, it was the first time that members David Sylvian, Mick Karn, Steve Jansen and Richard Barbieri had collaborated as a four-piece since 1982. The album peaked at number 24 on the UK Albums Chart.

== Background ==
The name Rain Tree Crow was chosen to mark a break from Japan's past, with the intention of creating a new long-term project. As the music turned out to be less commercial than originally envisaged, all members of the band aside from Sylvian became amenable to the idea of retaining the Japan moniker, in order to gain maximum exposure. Virgin Records pressured the musicians to let them market the album under the name Japan; however, Sylvian was adamant that this would not take place. Sylvian's opinion prevailed and the album was released as by Rain Tree Crow.

It was decided early on that the project would involve only group compositions, as opposed to the group's earlier modus operandi where songs were largely based on Sylvian's ideas.

According to Karn, "the whole concept and direction of that album was that it was going to be very pop-oriented", wanting "to surprise people by doing the unexpected—by coming back into a market which we'd left behind a very long time ago. So, we decided that we would have a new name— Rain Tree Crow. The more obscure the name, the better. We believed that it would be a long-term project and that the name Rain Tree Crow would become more important than the name Japan".

There had initially been talk about doing a second or third album, and possibly touring, but ultimately, personalities clashed toward the end of the project, with Sylvian citing differences of opinion, money and the re-emergence of "old tensions and frustrations".

== Recording ==
Recording took place at two main studies: one in France (Studio Miraval) for its excellent quality recording rooms; and second in Italy (Condulmer, near Venice). The musicians recorded a month or slightly longer at echo studio, with extensive improvisation and constant recording of all experimentation. "This concept of impromptu performances represented a sharp contrast to the ways in which the group had originally worked."

It was the last time all four group members collaborated, but it laid the groundwork for other related projects. In particular, Jansen Barbieri Karn, also known as JBK, emerged afterwards.

In an interview in 2009, Sylvian said:

"Although much of the finished work incorporates seeds of the original improvisations from which it grew, there was a lot of re-recording and polishing of the material. I don’t remember there being too much of a struggle regarding the different directions the material took although I do remember I’d frequently be forced to justify my decisions whereby one piece or approach might be deemed out of context and another not. ‘Blackwater’ might be the exception here. I think I fought harder for that track than any other. Not because it was of the greatest interest but it was a strong piece that worked well in the body of the remainder of the album".

— Interview by Markus Deisenberger on 22 November 2009

== Release and reception ==
Professional ratings
Review scores
Source	Rating
AllMusic	4/5 stars
NME	2/10
Trouser Press	positive
Uncut	2/5 stars

"Blackwater" was released as the album's only single and reached number 62 in the UK Singles Chart in March 1991. The album reached number 24 in the UK Albums Chart.

The album was remastered and reissued on CD in 2003. The B-side track from the "Blackwater" single, "I Drink To Forget", was included on this reissue, but omitted on the later vinyl reissue of March 2019.

== Track listing ==
All tracks are written by Rain Tree Crow.

Rain Tree Crow track listing
No.	Title	Length
1.	"Big Wheels in Shanty Town"	7:08
2.	"Every Colour You Are"	4:46
3.	"Rain Tree Crow"	2:04
4.	"Red Earth (As Summertime Ends)"	3:38
5.	"Pocket Full of Change"	6:08
6.	"Boat's for Burning"	0:45
7.	"New Moon at Red Deer Wallow"	5:12
8.	"Blackwater"	4:19
9.	"A Reassuringly Dull Sunday"	1:22
10.	"Blackcrow Hits Shoe Shine City"	5:14
11.	"Scratchings on the Bible Belt"	2:46
12.	"Cries and Whispers"	2:31
Total length:		45:53

2003 bonus track
No.	Title	Length
13.	"I Drink to Forget"	1:46
Total length:		47:39

== Personnel ==
Rain Tree Crow

- David Sylvian – vocals (1–3, 5–6, 8, 10, 12), electric guitar (1, 2, 5–8, 10–12), organ (1, 5, 9, 10), electric piano (1–2, 10), shortwave radio (1, 2), horn arrangement (1), treatments (2, 10, 12), percussion (3, 9, 13), slide guitar (4), synthesizers (4, 8–10, 13), Indian drum (4), bass (7), banjo (11), marimba (11), harmonium (11), prepared piano (13)
- Mick Karn – bass (1–2, 4–5, 8, 10, 12), brass (1, 5), horn arrangement (1), saxophone (2, 10), pipes (3), tabla (4), bass clarinet (7, 9, 11), percussion (9), wine glasses (13)
- Steve Jansen – drums (1–2, 5, 8, 10), percussion (2–5, 8–10, 12–13), ceramic drums (4), additional organ (5), tambourine (6), Moroccan clay drums (7), fan drums (7), marimba (9, 11), piano (11), wine glasses (13)
- Richard Barbieri – synthesizers (1–13), piano (9), water wheel (11)

Additional musicians

- Bill Nelson – electric guitar (1, 8, 10)
- Djene Doumbouya – vocals (1)
- Djanka Djabate – vocals (1)
- The Phantom Horns:
  - Johnny Thirkell – trumpet/flugelhorn (1)
  - Gary Barnacle – saxophones (1)
- Phil Palmer – slide guitar (2), acoustic guitar (4)
- Michael Brook – bass conga (4), treatments (5, 11), percussion (9), Infinite Guitar (10)
- Brian Gascoigne – orchestration (4)

Technical

- David Sylvian – art director, mixing (1–13)
- Pat McCarthy – engineering, mixing (2, 3, 6, 7, 11)
- Steve Nye – mixing (1, 4, 5, 8–10, 12)
- Al Stone – assistant mixing (1, 4, 5, 8–10, 12)
- Shinya Fujiwara – cover photography
- Russell Mills – design
- Yuka Fujii – art director
- Tim Martin – additional engineering
- Paolo Carrer – assistant
- Rupert Coulson – assistant
- Louise McCormick – assistant
- Bruce Davies – assistant
- Paul Stevens – assistant
- Richard Chadwick – co-ordinator
- Tony Cousins – reissue remastering

== Charts ==
Chart (1991)	Peak position
Canada Top Albums/CDs (RPM)	72
Japanese Albums (Oricon)	49
Dutch Albums (Album Top 100)	61
Swedish Albums (Sverigetopplistan)	33
UK Albums (Official Charts)	24
Chart (2019)	Peak position
Scottish Albums (Official Charts)	85
UK Vinyl Albums (OCC)	12
