= Red Guitar =

1984 single by David Sylvian

Single by David Sylvian

from the album Brilliant Trees
- B-side: "Forbidden Colours" (version)
- Released: 21 May 1984
- Recorded: 1983–1984, London / Berlin
- Genre: Art rock
- Length: 5:09 (album version); 4:24 (single version)
- Label: Virgin
- Songwriter: David Sylvian
- Producers: Steve Nye; David Sylvian

David Sylvian singles chronology
"Forbidden Colours" (1983)	"Red Guitar" (1984)	"The Ink in the Well" (1984)

"Red Guitar" is a song by the English singer-songwriter David Sylvian. Released in May 1984, it was his debut solo single (not counting his two earlier singles with Ryuichi Sakamoto) and taken from his first solo album Brilliant Trees. It reached a peak position of number 17 on the UK Singles Chart.

== Reception ==
Reviewing the song for Record Mirror, Dylan Jones wrote "through the mesh, through the ferns, behind the mask and out on his own we find the reluctant pop-star David Sylvian, taking yet another MOODIST pose on the single sleeve. Not a stunning debut by any means, but an adept performance, even if it has got too many atmospherics and Aladdin Sane piano fills". Dave Rimmer for Smash Hits made it Single of the Fortnight and wrote "by all accounts one of the least weird tracks on the forthcoming solo LP, this is quiet, un-Japan-like, almost jazzy". However, Karen Swayne for Number One wrote that "Japanophiles won't be disappointed. There's no great change in style, but it's still all a bit self-consciously arty and angst-ridden" and that "Sylvian's voice is a Ferry derivative, and tends to drone on in a melancholy fashion without ever really getting anywhere".

== Music video ==
The music video was directed by Anton Corbijn, whose work on Propaganda's "Dr. Mabuse" led Sylvian to approach him. It was inspired by and an homage to British photographer Angus McBean. Sylvian had seen McBean's portrait of actress Flora Robson from 1938 and wanted to base the video off of it. The black-and-white video featured an appearance by McBean lipsyncing to a verse of the song, as McBean only agreed to the use of his Robson portrait so long as he was credited in the video and so it was decided that he should make an appearance.

== Track listings ==
7"

1. "Red Guitar" – 4:24
2. "Forbidden Colours" (version) – 5:53

12"

1. "Red Guitar" (full-length version) – 5:06
2. "Forbidden Colours" (version) – 5:53

== Personnel ==
- David Sylvian – vocals, synthesizer, cover
- Ronny Drayton – guitar
- Phil Palmer – guitar
- Wayne Brathwaite – bass guitar
- Ryuichi Sakamoto – piano
- Steve Nye – additional synthesizer, engineer
- Steve Jansen – drums, percussion
- Mark Isham – trumpet
- Peter Williams – engineer
- Allan Soh – cover
- L. Easton – cover
- Simon Gargette – cover

== Chart positions ==
Chart (1984)	Peak position
Ireland (IRMA)	13
UK Singles (OCC)	17
