= Russell Mills (artist) =

British artist (born 1952)

Russell Mills (born 1952) is a British artist. He has produced record covers and book covers for Brian Eno, the Cocteau Twins, Michael Nyman, David Sylvian, Peter Gabriel, and Nine Inch Nails.

As a recording artist, he has collaborated with musicians including David Sylvian, Ian McCulloch and Peter Gabriel. He has released three CDs with his recording project Undark, one of them on the British ambient label Em:t Records. The last, Pearl + Umbra, was released on Bella Union, to positive reviews.

Mills was visiting tutor (until 2012) at the Royal College of Art, visiting professor at the Glasgow School of Art.

== Emergence as music packaging designer ==
In the 1980s, Mills began receiving commissions to design record album covers and associated packaging. Stylistically, his work at this time became abstract, abandoning figurative representation in favor of symbolic allusions. He regularly treated the canvas as a sculptural plane, with materials such as metals, powders, bones, feathers, beeswax, fabric, wires, animal skins and papers embedded in thick paints and pastes. Works of this period generally occupy the entirety of the canvas with little or no "negative space" left.

Notable album covers include:

- Roger Eno, Between Tides
- Japan, Exorcising Ghosts
- Harold Budd and Brian Eno, The Pearl
- Roger Eno, Voices
- David Sylvian, Gone to Earth
- Michael Brook, Hybrid
- Nine Inch Nails, The Downward Spiral, Hesitation Marks
- The Overload (illustration for the Talking Heads song in their book, What the Songs Look Like)

An analysis of the symbolic meaning of the elements used to create the cover for Roger Eno's Between Tides appears in the 1999 book 100 Best Album Covers, edited by Storm Thorgerson and Aubrey Powell (of the design group Hipgnosis.)

Mills is also the co-author of the 1986 book "More Dark Than Shark" with Brian Eno, the book being a collection of interviews with Eno and Mills's artistic interpretations of the lyrics to songs off Eno's first four solo albums.

== Work with Nine Inch Nails ==
Russell Mills worked with Nine Inch Nails in 1994–1997 and again in 2012–15.

In 1994, he was commissioned to create the entire visual world of The Downward Spiral, beginning with the artwork for the album's cover and booklet, and extending to all of the associated singles (including March of the Pigs and Closer to God), the remix collection Further Down the Spiral, the 1997 video cassette compilation Closure, the 2004 Deluxe Edition and DualDisc re-releases of The Downward Spiral, (which was accompanied by several new Mills compositions downloadable from the Nine Inch Nails website), and various promotional materials.

These interrelated works contain Mills's heaviest use of organic materials to depict a sense of fragility and decay. Animal skeletons, sets of teeth, blood, feathers, and dead insects are liberally embedded in the canvases. In some pieces, materials have been affixed and then exposed to water or chemical elements, so that their decay is imprinted on the surface of the artwork.

In 2012, work began on the cover art for the album Hesitation Marks, released in 2013, and subsequently an art book called Cargo in the Blood, released in December 2015.

== Advent of digital design in ==
From the later 1990s to the present, Mills' work has again evolved to a new style, made possible by the advent of computer design applications such as Photoshop. The "collage" aesthetic is still seen, but now in a virtual/digital form, with many abutting and overlapping semi-transparent images, often cropped into crisp, aligned rectangles.

Mills still uses hand-drawn or -painted imagery, but as often as not it is scanned into the computer and treated as another malleable collage element. Images of water and sky are frequently seen, and a cooler color palette often prevails (in contrast to an earlier reliance on earth tones).

Negative space is still a rarity in Mills' compositions. Many of the musicians who choose Mills as an illustrator compose music that is "ambient" to varying degrees. Many of the album covers visually reflect this, in that they can be viewed quickly for an overall emotional impression, while intense perusal reveals many painstakingly layered details.

Notable album covers from 1995 to the present include:

- Ocean of Sound and Haunted Weather, both compiled by David Toop
- Panthalassa: The Music of Miles Davis 1969–1974, Miles Davis
- BBC Sessions, Cocteau Twins
- Dead Bees on a Cake and associated singles, David Sylvian
- The Redesign, Bill Laswell (under the pseudonym of "Operazone")
- Several albums by Michael Nyman, reissued in 2005

== Music ==
In addition to soundtracking several multimedia exhibits (see below), Russell Mills has released two albums to date:

- Undark (1996) (re-released in 2000 as "Undark One: Strange Familiar")
- Pearl + Umbra (1999) (re-released in 2000 as "Undark Two: Pearl + Umbra")

Both albums originated from Mills "collecting sounds" from musicians, many of whose albums he has illustrated. He then collaged the organic and electronic sounds into ambient pieces (with one or two vocal "songs" per album), with varying degrees of collaboration with the originating artists.

Featured contributors to Undark (aka "Undark One: Strange Familiar"):

- Michael Brook
- Declan Colgan
- Hywel Davies
- The Edge (of U2)
- Brian Eno
- Roger Eno
- Robin Guthrie (of Cocteau Twins)
- Bill Laswell
- Kevin Shields (of My Bloody Valentine)
- Tom Smyth & Will Joss (credited as "Miasma" on the original 1996 em:t release)

Featured contributors to Pearl + Umbra:

- Ildefonso Aguilar
- Samuel Aguilar
- John Aitken
- Eraldo Bernocchi
- Michael Brook
- Harold Budd
- Mark Clifford (of Seefeel)
- Declan Colgan
- Huw Costin
- Sussan Deyhim
- Brian Eno
- Roger Eno
- Mike Fearon
- Ali Foster
- Peter Gabriel
- Robin Guthrie (of Cocteau Twins)
- Graham Haynes
- Derek Hook
- Bill Laswell
- Graham Lewis
- Hamish Mackintosh
- Ian McCullough
- Tony McSweeney
- Ann Mills
- Sam Mills
- Thurston Moore (of Sonic Youth)
- Paul Schütze
- David Sylvian
- Clodagh Simonds
- Tom Smyth
- Mitsuo Tate
- Jonny Tomlinson
- Emma Townshend
- Ian Walton
- Hector Zazou

== Multimedia soundtracks ==
- Measured in Shadows (1995, with Ian Walton & Big Block 454)
- Republic of Thorns (2001, with Ian Walton & Paul Farley and Mike Fearon)
- Cleave / Soft Bullets (2002, with Mike Fearon)
- Still Moves is a series of six limited-edition books charting the evolution of the multimedia installations Russell Mills has created since 1994. Each book contains interpretative texts, photographs of the installations and two CDs of contextually anchored and process-driven atmospheric sound works made for site-specific installations. Still Moves | one and Still Moves | two were released by Slow Fuse Sound in November 2015 and 2016, respectively.

Still Moves | one
- Between Two Lights [1994] – 20:48
- Soundings [1995] – 15:29
- Looming [1996] – 7:33
- Measured in Shadows [1996-97] – 22:19
- Still Moves [1999] – 17:45
- Mantle (Sonic Boom Catalogue Edit) [2000] – 7:02
- Mantle (Extended Edit) [2000] – 31:05

Still Moves | two
- Republic of Thorns [2001] – 31:12
- Cleave | Soft Bullets [2002] – 48:15
