= Steve Tibbetts =

American guitarist and composer (born 1954)

- Born: 1954 (age 71–72); Madison, Wisconsin, U.S.
- Genres: jazz fusion
- Occupation: Musician
- Instrument: Guitar
- Years active: 1977–present
- Labels: ECM, Hannibal, Six Degrees, Rykodisc
- Website: frammis.com

Steve Tibbetts (born 1954) is an American guitarist and composer. He views the recording studio as a tool for creating sounds. Most of his albums include percussionist Marc Anderson.

== Style ==
Tibbetts plays acoustic and electric guitar and exotic percussive instruments such as the kendang and kalimba. His music has been described as rock, jazz, ambient, experimental, and world music. Tibbetts refers to it as "postmodern neo-primitivism". Often more than one genre or style is found in a single composition.

On guitar he uses a string-bending technique to imitate a sarangi while alternating between ambient soundscapes and electric distortion. He incorporates field recording, such as the footsteps in the track "Running" from Safe Journey and the chanting of Nepalese villagers on Big Map Idea. His albums often include percussion by Marc Anderson. The album A Man About a Horse included tracks based on rhythms built from different pitches and speeds. These recordings were then sampled, sequenced, and looped on synthesizers. He stated, "I go back and forth between the sampler and tape machine so much—looping, cutting, offsetting, and layering—that eventually I don't know where the sounds come from." A collection of his loops and textures entitled Friendly Fire was released in 2002 by Sonic Foundry for their Acid Loops series.

== History ==
Tibbetts was born in Madison, Wisconsin, in 1954. When he was twelve years old, he started to play guitar and was attracted to the electric distortion of the Blind Joe Mendelbaum Blues Band. He went to Macalester College in St. Paul, Minnesota, where he experimented with distortion pedals and other devices that could be plugged into a guitar. He met drummer Marc Anderson in college, and the two began a lifelong collaboration. Tibbetts has cited jazz guitarist Bill Connors as an influence and the fingerstyle technique of Harvey Mandel.

His first album, released in 1976, received attention on Minnesota public radio. His second, Yr (Frammis, 1980) was the first to be recorded with Anderson. His first album for a major label was Northern Song for ECM in 1982. This was an attempt to fit into producer Manfred Eicher's style of recording in two or three days. Northern Song received scathing reviews. Tibbetts returned to his method of recording slowly over a period of months or longer. His subsequent records gained better reviews. He released five albums in the 1980s, three in the 1990s. He has collaborated with Norwegian hardingfele player Knut Hamre and Tibetan Buddhist nun Chöying Drolma.

Tibbetts stopped doing live performances regularly in the mid-1980s. Tibbetts and Anderson have toured on other occasions, including a 1988 YR tour, a 1991–1992 Big Map Idea tour, and shows with Chöying Drolma in 1997, 1999, and 2005. Starting in the late 1980s he travelled extensively in Nepal, which is where he met Drolma. Their first collaboration, Chö, was not intended as a commercial record but it was released and gained some positive notice. The second album, Selwa, was a more carefully considered collaboration and was praised as a successful meeting between different musical traditions. These albums helped establish Drolma's career on the Nepalese music chart.

== Discography ==
- Steve Tibbetts (Frammis, 1977)
- Yr (Frammis, 1980)
- Northern Song (ECM, 1982)
- Safe Journey (ECM, 1984)
- Exploded View (ECM, 1986)
- Big Map Idea (ECM, 1989)
- The Fall of Us All (ECM, 1994)
- Chö (Hannibal, 1997) with Chöying Drolma
- A Man About a Horse (ECM, 2002)
- Selwa (Six Degrees, 2004) with Chöying Drolma
- Natural Causes (ECM, 2010)
- Life Of (ECM, 2018)
- Hellbound Train - An Anthology (ECM, 2022)
- Close (ECM, 2025)
