= Brilliant Trees =

Studio album by David Sylvian
- Released: 25 June 1984
- Recorded: 1983–1984
- Studios: Hansa Tonstudio (Berlin, Germany); The Church Studios (London, England)
- Genres: Art rock; avant-pop
- Length: 39:37
- Label: Virgin
- Producers: David Sylvian; Steve Nye

David Sylvian chronology
Brilliant Trees (1984)	Alchemy: An Index of Possibilities (1985)

Singles from Brilliant Trees
- 1. "Red Guitar" Released: 21 May 1984; 2. "The Ink in the Well" Released: 6 August 1984; 3. "Pulling Punches" Released: 22 October 1984

Alternative cover
- 2003 remastered edition

Brilliant Trees is the debut solo studio album by the English musician David Sylvian, released on 25 June 1984 by Virgin Records. The album peaked at number 4 on the UK Albums Chart and has been certified Gold by the British Phonographic Industry (BPI) for sales in excess of 100,000 copies.

== History ==
Sylvian in an interview 1984, about 4 track home recording.

Produced by Sylvian with Steve Nye, Brilliant Trees was Sylvian's first studio album release after the break-up of his band Japan in December 1982 (though former Japan members Steve Jansen and Richard Barbieri both appear on the album). AllMusic called the album "an eclectic affair fusing funk, jazz, and ambient." Additional musicians on the album included Holger Czukay, Danny Thompson, Jon Hassell, Mark Isham, Ronny Drayton, Kenny Wheeler, Phil Palmer and Ryuichi Sakamoto of Yellow Magic Orchestra (YMO). Sylvian and Sakamoto had previously collaborated on the singles "Bamboo Houses" and "Forbidden Colours", and continued to collaborate at various points in their careers.

Brilliant Trees was recorded August 1983 at Hansa in Berlin, and over about 6 weeks in London at the end of 1983 and the beginning of 1984. With the majority of vocal overdubs completed at The Church Studios in Crouch End, Sylvian and Nye then relocated to AIR Studios to begin mixing.

Lyrically, the album includes references to writers, thinkers and artistic figures who were influencing Sylvian at the time, including Jean-Paul Sartre, Pablo Picasso and Jean Cocteau. For instance, the song "The Ink in the Well" references Cocteau's film The Blood of a Poet (1932) and Sartre's novel The Age of Reason (1945). Many of the lyrics also express Sylvian's searching explorations of spirituality in different forms.

For the recording of the album Sylvian decided to work with musicians he respected as a dedicated band, tailoring the arrangements around their involvement and giving them each a specific role, rather than hiring less passionate session musicians. A great admirer of Holger Czukay's studio album Movies (1979), Sylvian also invited the German musician to contribute to the album. Czukay supplied the innovative samples played back on a dictaphone, and became a close friend of Sylvian.

== Release ==
The album peaked at number 4 in the UK, the highest chart position of Sylvian's career to date, and contains his biggest solo hit, "Red Guitar", which reached number 17 on the UK Singles Chart. In 1994, ten years after its release, the album was certified Gold by the BPI for sales in excess of 100,000 copies.

In 1994, the album was reissued in the US as Brilliant Trees / Words with the Shaman, which included the three part EP Words with the Shaman as bonus tracks; these songs were also included on the cassette-only album Alchemy: An Index of Possibilities (1985). In 2003, a remastered limited digipak version of Brilliant Trees was released. In 2006 it was reissued in a standard jewel-case. The album cover for both releases was altered to a cropped photo of Sylvian with new type fonts.

In February 2019, as part of a redesigned monochrome sleeved vinyl reissue batch of his 1980s albums, Brilliant Trees was released in a gatefold sleeve, once again with a new set of type fonts. No new mastering was done for this; the 2003 remaster was used.

== Critical reception ==
Professional ratings
Review scores
Source	Rating
AllMusic	4/5 stars
Classic Rock	9/10
The Guardian	3/5 stars
Mojo	4/5 stars
Pitchfork	8.5/10
Q	4/5 stars
Record Mirror	5/5 stars
The Rolling Stone Album Guide	3.5/5 stars
Smash Hits	8/10
Uncut	8/10

Brilliant Trees was well received by the contemporary British music press. "Sylvian has grown up," wrote Sounds critic Carole Linfield. "He's left art school, gone through the grey and come out in a spectrum of pastel shades that entrance and enthral. Gone is the clichéd imagery that once haunted Japan... in its place is a solo artist who deserves more respect than his beautiful face often allows." In an enthusiastic review, Melody Maker's Steve Sutherland, who had previously been critical of Sylvian's work with Japan, concluded that "Brilliant Trees inadvertently attains the stature Sylvian's always sought. It's a masterpiece."

Richard Cook for NME described the album as "private and intolerant – really, an astonishing statement from one in his position – but it is a transformation of thought into music which involves the finest skill, an uncanny talent." Betty Page for Record Mirror described it as "all oh-so-fragile but meaty at the same time, obviously occasionally un peu pretentious, but very painstakingly crafted and built up with great care and affection."

Sylvian biographer Martin Power found that the Side two of the record required the listener to enter "into new, more demanding territories".

== Track listing ==
All tracks written by David Sylvian except "Weathered Wall" and "Brilliant Trees", co-written with Jon Hassell.

Side one

1. "Pulling Punches" – 5:02
2. "The Ink in the Well" – 4:30
3. "Nostalgia" – 5:41
4. "Red Guitar" – 5:09

Side two

1. "Weathered Wall" – 5:44
2. "Backwaters" – 4:52
3. "Brilliant Trees" – 8:39

== Personnel ==
Musicians

- David Sylvian – lead vocals, guitar, piano (treated), tapes, synthesizer, percussion instruments
- Richard Barbieri – synthesizer (1, 5)
- Wayne Brathwaite – bass guitar (1, 4)
- Holger Czukay – French horn, voice, guitar, dictaphone.
- Ronny Drayton – guitar (1, 4)
- Jon Hassell – trumpet (5, 7)
- Mark Isham – trumpet track (1, 4)
- Steve Jansen – drums, synthesizer, percussion
- Steve Nye – synthesizer (3, 4)
- Phil Palmer – guitar (1, 4)
- Ryuichi Sakamoto – synthesizer/piano (4, 5, 7)
- Danny Thompson – double bass (2)
- Kenny Wheeler – flugelhorn (2, 3)

Technical

- David Sylvian – producer for Klangfarben Productions, mixing assistant
- Steve Nye – record producer for Klangfarben Productions, sound engineer, audio mixing (1, 3–5, 7)
- Peter Williams – sound engineer, mixing assistant
- Nigel Walker – mixing (2, 6)
- Matt Butler – assistant mixing (2, 6)
- Yuka Fujii – photography

== Charts ==
Chart (1984)	Peak position
Australian Albums (Kent Music Report)	96
Canada Top Albums/CDs (RPM)	50
Dutch Albums (Album Top 100)	7
Japanese Albums (Oricon)	16
New Zealand Albums (RMNZ)	37
Swedish Albums (Sverigetopplistan)	33
UK Albums (Official Charts)	4
