= Ryuichi Sakamoto discography =

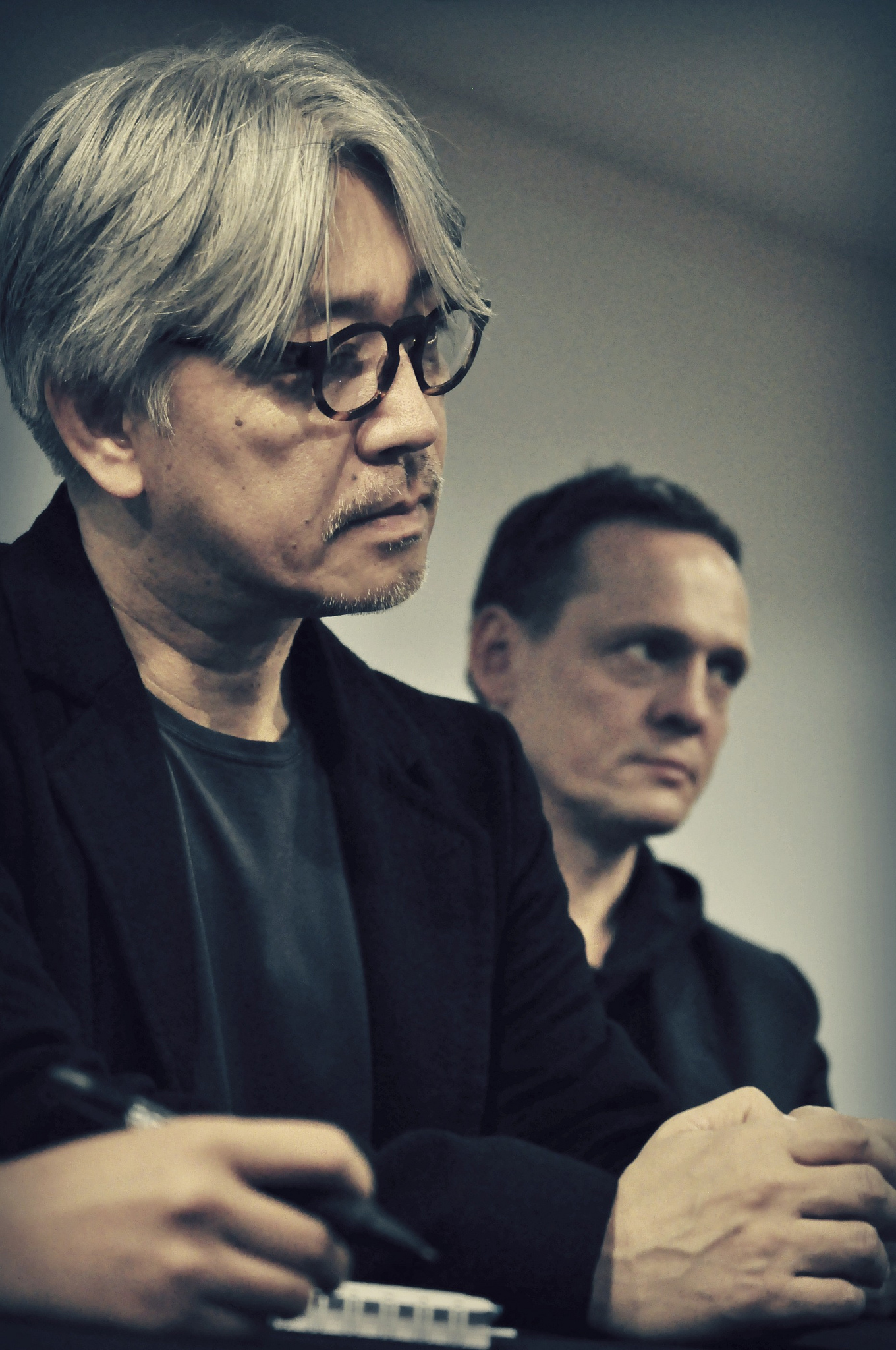
- Sakamoto and Alva Noto at a press conference
- Studio albums: 24
- EPs: 3
- Soundtrack albums: 49
- Live albums: 12
- Compilation albums: 14
- Tribute albums: 1
- Singles: 49
- Video albums: 6
- Music videos: 8

The Japanese musician Ryuichi Sakamoto (1952–2023) released over 20 solo studio albums, over 25 collaboration albums, 3 remix albums, more than 10 live albums, several compilation albums, over 40 EPs and singles, and about 50 soundtracks. Several of the albums exist in both Japanese and internationally released versions, sometimes containing different track listings. Sakamoto has also released many video albums and music videos.

== Albums ==
=== Solo studio albums ===
| Year | Album details | Peak chart positions | | |
| Year | Album details | JPN | AUS | US Cla. |
|---|---|---|---|---|
| 1978 | Thousand Knives: Released: October 25, 1978; Labels: Nippon Columbia; Formats: LP | — | — | — |
| 1980 | B-2 Unit: Released: September 21, 1980; Labels: Alfa Records; Formats: LP | 19 | — | — |
| 1981 | Left-Handed Dream: Released: October 5, 1981; Labels: Alfa Records; Formats: LP | 20 | — | — |
| 1983 | Coda: Released: December 10, 1983; Labels: London Records; Formats: LP | 38 | | |
| 1984 | Ongaku Zukan^{[A]}: Released: October 24, 1984; Labels: Midi; Formats: LP | 5 | — | — |
| 1985 | Esperanto (music for a dance performance): Released: October 5, 1985; Labels: Midi; Formats: LP | 9 | — | — |
| 1986 | Futurista: Released: April 21, 1986; Labels: Midi; Formats: LP | 5 | — | — |
| 1987 | Neo Geo: Released: July 1, 1987; Labels: Sony Music; Formats: LP | 8 | — | — |
| 1989 | Beauty: Released: November 21, 1989; Labels: Virgin Records; Formats: LP | 14 | — | — |
| 1991 | Heartbeat: Released: October 21, 1991; Labels: Virgin Records; Formats: LP | 6 | 94 | — |
| 1994 | Sweet Revenge: Released: June 17, 1994; Labels: For Life Music; Formats: LP | 7 | — | — |
| 1995 | Smoochy: Released: October 20, 1995; Labels: For Life Music; Formats: LP | 28 | — | — |
| 1996 | 1996: Released: May 17, 1996; Labels: For Life Music; Formats: LP | — | — | — |
| 1998 | BTTB: Released: November 30, 1998; Labels: Warner Music Japan; Formats: LP | 26 | — | — |
| 2002 | Comica: Released: February 27, 2002; Labels: Warner Music Japan; Formats: LP | — | — | — |
| 2002 | Elephantism: Released: May 15, 2002; Labels: Warner Music Japan; Formats: LP | — | — | — |
| 2004 | Chasm: Released: February 25, 2004; Labels: Warner Music Japan; Formats: LP | 19 | — | — |
| 2004 | /04: Released: November 24, 2004; Labels: Warner Music Japan; Formats: LP | — | | |
| 2005 | /05: Released: September 28, 2005; Labels: Warner Music Japan; Formats: LP | 28 | | |
| 2009 | Out of Noise: Released: March 4, 2009; Labels: Commmons; Formats: LP | 16 | — | — |
| 2009 | Playing the Piano: Released: September 23, 2009; Labels: Commmons; Formats: LP | 41 | — | 10 |
| 2016 | Plankton (music for an installation): Released: 2016; Labels: Milan; Formats: LP / CD / digital | | | |
| 2017 | async: Released: April 28, 2017; Labels: Milan; Formats: CD / digital / 2xLP | 20 | — | 5 |
| 2023 | 12: Released: January 17, 2023; Labels: Milan; Formats: Digital | 4 | — | — |
"—" denotes items which were not released in that country or failed to chart.

- A Released internationally in 1986, with an altered track listing, as Illustrated Musical Encyclopedia.

=== Remix albums ===
| Year | Album details | Peak chart positions |
| Year | Album details | JPN |
|---|---|---|
| 2006 | Bricolages: Released: 24 May 2006; Labels: Warner; Formats: CD | 81 |
| 2018 | async - Remodels: Released: 16 February 2018; Labels: Milan; Formats: Digital, CD, LP | — |
| 2022 | To the Moon and Back: Released: 30 November 2022; Labels: Milan; Formats: Digital | — |

=== Collaboration albums ===
| Year | Album details |
|---|---|
| 1975 | Disappointment-Hateruma (with Tsuchitori Toshiyuki) |
| 1978 | Paraiso (with Haruomi Hosono) |
| 1979 | Summer Nerves (with Kakutougi Session) |
| 1982 | The End of Asia (with Danceries) |
| 1982 | The Arrangement (with Robin Scott) (originally released as an EP and later expanded into a full album with album-free singles) |
| 1983 | Chanconette Tedesche (with Danceries) |
| 1993 | Asian Games [live] (with Yōsuke Yamashita and Bill Laswell) |
| 2001 | Casa (with Jaques and Paula Morelenbaum, as Morelenbaum²/Sakamoto) |
| 2001 | Morelenbaum²/Sakamoto "Live in Tokyo" [live] (with Jaques and Paula Morelenbaum, as Morelenbaum²/Sakamoto) |
| 2002 | Vrioon (with Carsten Nicolai, as alva noto + ryuichi sakamoto) |
| 2003 | A Day in New York (with Jaques and Paula Morelenbaum, as Morelenbaum²/Sakamoto) |
| 2005 | Insen (with Carsten Nicolai, as alva noto + ryuichi sakamoto) |
| 2007 | Cendre (with Fennesz) |
| 2007 | Ocean Fire (with Christopher Willits, as Willits + Sakamoto) |
| 2008 | utp_ [live] (with Alva Noto and Ensemble Modern) |
| 2010 | UTAU (with Taeko Onuki) |
| 2011 | Flumina (with Fennesz) |
| 2011 | Summvs (with Carsten Nicolai, as alva noto + ryuichi sakamoto) |
| 2012 | Ancient Future (with Christopher Willits, as Willits + Sakamoto) |
| 2012 | Three (with Jaques Morelenbaum and Judy Kang) |
| 2012 | Snow, Silence, Partially Sunny [live] (with Sachiko M) |
| 2013 | Disappearance (with Taylor Deupree) |
| 2015 | Perpetual (with Taylor Deupree and Illuha, as Taylor Deupree / Illuha / Ryuichi Sakamoto) |
| 2018 | Glass [live] (with Alva Noto) |
| 2018 | Glenn Gould Gathering [live] (with Alva Noto, Nilo, Fennesz, Francesco Tristano) |
| 2019 | TWO: Live at Sydney Opera House [live] (with Alva Noto) |
| 2019 | Live in London [live] (with Taylor Deupree) |
| 2026 | 12 Conversations (with Alva Noto) |

=== Live albums ===
| Year | Album details | Peak chart positions | |
| Year | Album details | JPN | US Cla. |
|---|---|---|---|
| 1986 | Media Bahn Live: Released: September 21, 1986; Label: Midi; Formats: LP | — | — |
| 1988 | Playing the Orchestra: Released: December 16, 1988; Label: Virgin Records; Formats: LP | — | — |
| 1995 | Sweet Revenge Tour 94: Released: January 20, 1995; Labels: For Life/Güt; Formats: CD | | |
| 1997 | Discord: Released: July 2, 1997; Label: Güt; Formats: CD | | |
| 1999 | Cinemage: Released: 1999; Label: Sony Classical Records; Formats: LP | — | — |
| 2000 | Audio Life: Released: February 23, 2000; Label: Warner Music Japan; Formats: LP | — | — |
| 2001 | In The Lobby: At G.E.H. in London: Released: March 22, 2001; Label: Warner Music Japan; Formats: LP | — | — |
| 2011 | playing the piano usa 2010 / Korea 2011 - ustream viewers selection: Released: December 14, 2011; Label: Commmons; Formats: CD | — | — |
| 2013 | Playing the Orchestra 2013: Released: December 11, 2013; Label: Commmons; Formats: CD | — | — |
| 2015 | The Best of 'Playing the Orchestra 2014': Released: December 16, 1988; Label: Commmons; Formats: LP | | |
| 2020 | Playing the Piano 12122020: Released: December 12, 2021; Label: KAB America Inc.; Formats: LP | — | — |
| 2021 | Garden Of Shadows And Light (with David Toop): Released: July 9, 2021; Label: ThirtyThree Records; Formats: LP | | |
| 2024 | Opus: Released: August 9, 2024; Label: Commmons; Formats: LP, CD, Blu-ray | | |
"—" denotes releases that did not chart.

=== Soundtrack albums ===
| Year | Album | Notes | Ref. |
|---|---|---|---|
| 1983 | Daijōbu, My Friend | | |
| 1983 | Merry Christmas Mr. Lawrence | | |
| 1986 | The Adventures of Chatran: Original Soundtrack | | |
| 1987 | Royal Space Force: The Wings of Honnêamise | | |
| 1987 | The Last Emperor | With David Byrne and Cong Su | |
| 1989 | Fantasy of Light and Life | | |
| 1989 | Tengai Makyou: Ziria | PC-Engine CD video game | |
| 1990 | The Sheltering Sky | | |
| 1990 | The Handmaid's Tale | | |
| 1991 | Peachboy "Momotaro" | | |
| 1992 | High Heels | | |
| 1992 | Emily Brontë's Wuthering Heights | | |
| 1992 | Tokyo Decadence | | |
| 1993 | Wild Palms | | |
| 1994 | Little Buddha | | |
| 1997 | The Other Side Of Love | Soundtrack for television series Stalker: Nigekirenu Ai | |
| 1998 | Snake Eyes | | |
| 1998 | Love Is the Devil: Study for a Portrait of Francis Bacon | | |
| 1999 | Gohatto | | |
| 1999 | Cinemage | | |
| 1999 | Poppoya | Composed the main theme | |
| 2000 | L.O.L.: Lack of Love | Dreamcast video game for which Sakamoto was also the scenario writer | |
| 2002 | Femme Fatale | | |
| 2002 | Century of Reform | | |
| 2002 | Derrida | Certain tracks from the film were released on the compilation album Minha Vida Como Um Filme (2002) | |
| 2002 | Alexei and the Spring | Certain tracks from the film were released on the compilation album Minha Vida Como Um Filme (2002) | |
| 2004 | Seven Samurai 20XX | PlayStation 2 video game | |
| 2005 | Shining Boy & Little Randy | | |
| 2005 | Tony Takitani | | |
| 2006 | Dawn of Mana | PlayStation 2 video game | |
| 2007 | Silk | | |
| 2008 | Indigo | Short film | |
| 2009 | Women Without Men | | |
| 2011 | Dhobi Ghat | | |
| 2011 | Hara-Kiri: Death of a Samurai | | |
| 2012 | I Have to Buy New Shoes | With Kotringo | |
| 2015 | Living With My Mother | Album released in 2016 under the alternative English title Nagasaki: Memories of My Son. | |
| 2015 | The Revenant | With Alva Noto, additional music by Bryce Dessner | |
| 2016 | Rage | | |
| 2017 | The Fortress | | |
| 2018 | Your Face | Taiwanese documentary | |
| 2018 | My Tyrano: Together, Forever | | |
| 2019 | Black Mirror: Smithereens | TV show | |
| 2019 | Proxima | | |
| 2020 | The Staggering Girl | Short film | |
| 2020 | Minamata | | |
| 2020 | Love After Love | | |
| 2021 | Beckett | | |
| 2022 | After Yang | | |
| 2022 | Exception | TV show | |
| 2023 | Monster | 2 new original tracks | |

=== Compilation albums ===
| Year | Album details | Peak chart positions |
| Year | Album details | JPN |
|---|---|---|
| 1982 | Tokyo Joe (with Kazumi Watanabe): Released: 1982; Labels: Nippon Columbia; Formats: LP | — |
| 1983 | Favorite Visions: Released: 1983; Labels: Better Days; Formats: LP | — |
| 1986 | Ryuichi Sakamoto Best Selection: Released: 1986; Labels: Alfa Records; Formats: LP | — |
| 1989 | Gruppo Musicale: Released: 1989; Labels: MIDI; Formats: CD | — |
| 1994 | Soundbytes: Released: May 17, 1994; Labels: Mesa/Bluemoon Recordings; Formats: LP | — |
| 1998 | The Very Best of Güt Years 1994–1997: Released: 1998; Labels: Güt; Formats: CD | — |
| 2002 | Works I – CM: Released: November 20, 2002; Labels: Midi; Formats: LP | — |
| 2003 | Moto.tronic: Released: November 11, 2003; Labels: Sony Music; Formats: LP | — |
| 2012 | Complete Güt Box: Released: December 4, 2012; Labels: Güt; Formats: CD | — |
| 2015 | Year Book 2005–2014: Released: January 17, 2015; Labels: Commmons; Formats: LP | 46 |
| 2016 | Year Book 1971–1979: Released: January 17, 2016; Labels: Commmons; Formats: LP | 77 |
| 2017 | Year Book 1980–1984: Released: March 29, 2017; Labels: Commmons; Formats: CD | — |
| 2018 | Year Book 1985–1989: Released: February 18, 2018; Labels: Commmons; Formats: CD | — |
| 2023 | Travesía (compiled by Alejandro González Iñárritu): Released: May 5, 2023; Label: Milan Records; Formats: LP, CD | — |
"—" denotes releases that did not chart.

=== Mini-albums ===
| Year | Album details | Ref. |
|---|---|---|
| 1997 | Music for Yohji Yamamoto: Collection, 1995: Released: January 29, 1997; Labels: Gut Records; Formats: Mini-LP | |
| 2001 | Zero Landmine (as part of N.M.L. No More Landmines): Released: April 25, 2001; Labels: Warner-Elektra-Atlantic Records; Formats: EP | |

== Singles and EPs ==
| Year | Single | Album |
|---|---|---|
| 1980 | "Riot in Lagos" | B-2 Unit |
| 1980 | "War Head" | Non-album single |
| 1981 | "Computer Obaachan" (with Syuko Sakai) | Non-album single |
| 1981 | "Front Line" | Non-album single |
| 1982 | "Ike Nai Rouge Magic" (with Kiyoshiro Imawano) | Non-album single |
| 1982 | "Bamboo Houses" (with David Sylvian) | Non-album single |
| 1982 | "The Arrangement" (with Robin Scott) | Non-album single |
| 1983 | "Life in Japan" | Non-album single |
| 1983 | "Forbidden Colours" (with David Sylvian) | Merry Christmas, Mr. Lawrence |
| 1983 | "Merry Christmas Mr. Lawrence" | Merry Christmas, Mr. Lawrence |
| 1985 | "Field Work" (with Thomas Dolby) | Non-album single |
| 1985 | "Steppin' into Asia" | Non-album single |
| 1986 | "G.T." | Futurista |
| 1986 | "Neo-Plant" (with Koharu Kisaragi) | Non-album single |
| 1987 | "Risky" (with Iggy Pop) | Neo Geo |
| 1987 | "The Last Emperor" (with David Byrne) | The Last Emperor |
| 1987 | "Behind the Mask" | Non-album single |
| 1989 | "Undo #1" | Non-album single |
| 1990 | "We Love You" | Beauty |
| 1990 | "You Do Me" (with Jill Jones) | Beauty (international version only) |
| 1992 | "Heartbeat (Tainai Kaiki II)" (with David Sylvian) | Heartbeat |
| 1994 | "Moving On" | Sweet Revenge |
| 1994 | "Love & Hate" (with Holly Johnson) | Sweet Revenge |
| 1994 | "Futari No Ha-Te (Sentimental)" (with Taeko Onuki) | Non-album single |
| 1997 | "The Other Side of Love" (featuring Sister M) | Non-album single |
| 1998 | "Prayer / Salvation" | Non-album remix single |
| 1998 | "Anger / Grief" | Non-album remix single |
| 1999 | "– ウラBTTB" | BTTB |
| 2000 | "Lost Child" | Non-album single |
| 2001 | "O Grande Amor" (with Morelenbaum²) | Casa |
| 2003 | "World Citizen" (with David Sylvian) | Chasm |
| 2004 | "Undercooled" | Chasm |
| 2005 | Sala Santa Cecilia (with Fennesz) | Live EP |
| 2006 | Revep (with Alva Noto) | EP |
| 2008 | "Koko" | UTAU |
| 2015 | "A Word I Give" (with Goldmund) | Sometimes (Goldmund album) |
| 2018 | "Ff2" | Non-album single |
| 2019 | "エナジー風呂 / Energy Flow" (with U-zhaan) | Non-album single |
| 2020 | "After Yang Main Theme" | After Yang |
| 2021 | "Tong Poo for JUNYA WATANABE" | Non-album single |
| 2021 | "Monomom" (with Alva Noto) | Summvs re-release |
| 2022 | "Ieta" | Non-album single |
| 2022 | "Barco" (with Alva Noto) | Insen re-release |
| 2022 | "City Radieuse" (with Alva Noto) | Revep re-release |
| 2022 | "Suite for Krug in 2008" | Non-album single |
| 2022 | "Freeflow" (with Alex Heffes) | Non-album single |
| 2022 | "Kizuna" | Summvs re-release |
| 2023 | Crystalline (with Alex Heffes) | EP |
| 2025 | The Unfinished (with Alex Heffes) | Posthumous EP |

== Video albums ==
| Year | Video details | Ref. |
|---|---|---|
| 1985 | TV War (with Radical TV): Distributor: CBS/Sony; Format: LaserDisc | |
| 1986 | Adelic Penguins: Distributor: Sony Video Software; Format: LaserDisc | |
| 2006 | Insen Live (as alva noto + ryuichi sakamoto): Released: October 2006; Distributor: Raster-Noton; Format: DVD | |
| 2008 | LIFE - fluid, invisible, inaudible... (as Ryuichi Sakamoto + Shiro Takatani): Released: May 28, 2008; Distributor: Commmons; Format: DVD | |
| 2015 | Playing the Orchestra 2014: Released: April 7, 2015; Distributor: Commmons; Format: DVD, Blu-ray | |
| 2015 | Trio Tour 2012 Japan: Released: December 9, 2015; Distributor: Commmons; Format: DVD, Blu-ray | |

== Music videos ==
| Year | Title | Director(s) | Ref. |
|---|---|---|---|
| 1982 | "Bamboo Music" (with David Sylvian) | | |
| 1983 | "Forbidden Colours" (with David Sylvian) | | |
| 1985 | "Field Work" (with Thomas Dolby) | Thomas Dolby | |
| 1987 | "Risky" (feat. Iggy Pop) | Meiert Avis | |
| 1990 | "You Do Me" (feat. Jill Jones) | | |
| 1992 | "Heartbeat (Tainai Kaiki II)" (feat. David Sylvian and Ingrid Chavez) | Kevin Westenberg | |
| 2003 | "Trioon I" (as alva noto + ryuichi sakamoto) | Karl Kliem | |
| 2013 | "Psychedelic Afternoon" (with David Byrne) | Uruma Delvi | |
| 2016 | "The Revenant Main Theme (Alva Noto Edit)" | Alejandro González Iñárritu | |

== Other album appearances ==
=== Soundtracks ===
| Year | Song(s) | Album | Notes | Ref. |
|---|---|---|---|---|
| 1989 | "Laserman" | Black Rain soundtrack | | |
| 1992 | "El Mar Mediterrani" | El Mar Mediterrani | Composition for 1992 Summer Olympics opening ceremony officially released on the 1997 mini-album of the same name | |
| 1998 | "Dreamcast Startup" | | Startup sound for the Dreamcast video game console | |
| 2003 | "Chinsagu No Hana" | Japanese Story soundtrack | An alternate mix by Elizabeth Drake originally from Beauty | |
| 2006 | "Bibo No Aozora", "Only Love Can Conquer Hate", "World Citizen (I Won't Be Disappointed)" | Babel soundtrack | Alternate mixes originally from 1996 and Chasm | |
| 2017 | "M.A.Y. in the Backyard", "Germination" | Call Me by Your Name soundtrack | | |

=== Guest appearances ===
| Year | Album | Artist | Details | Ref. |
|---|---|---|---|---|
| 1976 | Auroila | Lily | Arranger | |
| 1976 | Hi Tomoshi Goro | Maki Asakawa | Organ | |
| 1976 | Grey Skies | Taeko Onuki | Vibraphone, fender rhodes, marimba, organ, prepared piano, piano, Clavinet, tambourine, harpsichord, tubular bells, arp solina string ensemble, ARP Odyssey, arranger, string arrangements, arrangements | |
| 1977 | Sunshower | Taeko Onuki | Keyboards, arrangements, musical director, composer | |
| 1977 | SPACY | Tatsuro Yamashita | Acoustic and electric pianos, organ, vibraphone | |
| 1978 | Pacific | Haruomi Hosono, Shigeru Suzuki, Tatsuro Yamashita | Keyboards, piano, percussion, glockenspiel | |
| 1978 | Go Ahead! | Tatsuro Yamashita | Synthesizers, electric and acoustic pianos | |
| 1979 | Intimate | Keizo Inoue | Piano, synthesizer | |
| 1979 | Kylyn | Kazumi Watanabe | Co-producer, keyboards | |
| 1979 | Moonglow | Tatsuro Yamashita | Synthesizer | |
| 1980 | Romantique | Taeko Onuki | Arranger, conductor, mix engineer, keyboards | |
| 1980 | Gentlemen Take Polaroids | Japan | Co-writer ("Taking Islands in Africa") | |
| 1980 | Eating Pleasure | Sandii | Keyboards | |
| 1981 | Tadaima | Akiko Yano | Producer | |
| 1981 | Aventure | Taeko Onuki | Arranger, Prophet 5, rhodes piano, piano, analog synthesizer, mixing engineer | |
| 1981 | Neuromantic | Yukihiro Takahashi | Keyboards | |
| 1982 | What, Me Worry? | Yukihiro Takahashi | Keyboards | |
| 1983 | Rose | Mari Iijima | Producer | |
| 1984 | Brilliant Trees | David Sylvian | Guest piano/synthesizers on three tracks | |
| 1984 | Variety | Mariya Takeuchi | Synthesizers | |
| 1984 | Big Wave | Tatsuro Yamashita | Synthesizer | |
| 1985 | Copine | Taeko Onuki | Synthesizer, Rhodes, all instruments, mixing engineer, arranger | |
| 1985 | Alchemy: An Index of Possibilities | David Sylvian | Guest piano and strings on Steel Cathedrals | |
| 1985 | Memory Theatre | Ayuo Takahashi | Guest musician | |
| 1986 | Hope in a Darkened Heart | Virginia Astley | Producer | |
| 1986 | Venus Tanjō | Yukiko Okada | Co-writer ("Wonder Trip Lover", "Kuchibiru Network", "Nemurenu Yoru no AQUARIUS") | |
| 1986 | Album | Public Image Ltd | Synthesizer ("Rise", "Fishing", "Bags", "Ease") | |
| 1987 | Secrets of the Beehive | David Sylvian | Arrangement, organ, synthesizer, piano | |
| 1989 | Safety in Numbers | David van Tieghem | Keyboards | |
| 1991 | Les Nouvelles Polyphonies Corses | Les Nouvelles Polyphonies Corses | Piano, backing vocals | |
| 1991 | Mais | Marisa Monte | Keyboards, piano | |
| 1992 | Circuladô | Caetano Veloso | Sampler, Keyboards ("Neide Candolina"); Strings, Bass, Piano ("Lindeza") | |
| 1992 | Sahara Blue | Hector Zazou | Piano ("Ophelie", "Hapolot Kenym", "Harar et les Gallas") | |
| 1993 | Dreamland | Aztec Camera | Co-producer | |
| 1994 | Future Listening! | Towa Tei | Fender rhodes, strings, piano, arrangements | |
| 1995 | The Geisha Girls Show | Geisha Girls | Producer | |
| 1996 | O Corpo Sutil | Arto Lindsay | Guest musician | |
| 1996 | Red Hot + Rio | Red Hot Organization | Keyboards ("É Preciso Perdoar (You Must Forgive)") | |
| 1998 | Noon Chill | Arto Lindsay | Prepared piano, keyboards, piano | |
| 1999 | Dead Bees on a Cake | David Sylvian | Arrangement, piano, guitar, bansuri, insects | |
| 2000 | Everything and Nothing | David Sylvian | Arrangement, piano | |
| 2002 | Audio Sponge | Sketch Show | Keyboards, guitar [sample], clavinet | |
| 2003 | Strong Currents | Hector Zazou | Piano | |
| 2004 | Shine | Cyndi Lauper | Co-writer ("Eventually") | |
| 2004 | Astromantic | M-Flo | Guest musician ("I Wanna Be Down") | |
| 2004 | Cinema | Rodrigo Leão | Guest musician | |
| 2005 | Snow Borne Sorrow | Nine Horses | Piano ("Atom and Cell", "Snow Borne Sorrow") | |
| 2006 | Yellow Fever! | Senor Coconut | Guest musician | |
| 2008 | Sound Unbound | DJ Spooky | Song “The Need to Be” with Daniel Bernard Roumain | |
| 2008 | Telecoteco | Paula Morelenbaum | Piano | |
| 2009 | 影の無いヒト | Asa-Chang & Junray | Vocals | |
| 2011 | Heligoland (Extended Edition) | Massive Attack | Co-remixer ("Fatalism") | |
| 2011 | Forgetfulness | Natalie Beridze TBA | Co-writer ("Blue Shadow") | |
| 2018 | Love in the Time of Lexapro | Oneohtrix Point Never | Remix, production | |
| 2019 | Adult Baby | Kazu | Objects, chimes, triangle, tape loops, synthesizer, piano, field recordings | |
| 2021 | kiCK iiiii | Arca | Vocals ("Sanctuary") | |
| 2023 | D-Day | Agust D | Piano ("Snooze") | |
