= To the Moon and Back (album) =

A Tribute to Ryuichi Sakamoto – To the Moon and Back

Studio album by Ryuichi Sakamoto and various artists
- Released: November 30, 2022
- Length: 72:07
- Label: Milan
- Producer: Ryuichi Sakamoto

Ryuichi Sakamoto chronology
Exception (Soundtrack from the Netflix Anime Series) (2022)	A Tribute to Ryuichi Sakamoto – To the Moon and Back (2022)	12 (2023)

Singles from To the Moon and Back
- 1. "Thousand Knives" Released: October 5, 2022; 2. "Merry Christmas Mr. Lawrence" Released: November 16, 2022

A Tribute to Ryuichi Sakamoto – To the Moon and Back is a tribute album to Japanese multi-genre composer Ryuichi Sakamoto, released November 30, 2022, by Milan Records, two days ahead of its original release date. The album features reworked versions of Sakamoto's songs, referred to as "remodels", by artists including Devonté Hynes, the Cinematic Orchestra, Hildur Guðnadóttir, Alva Noto, and David Sylvian.

== Release ==
The first single, American bass guitarist Thundercat's version of the song "Thousand Knives", title track to the album of the same name, was released as a single on October 5, 2022. The second single, Electric Youth's take on "Merry Christmas Mr. Lawrence", was released November 16.

== Reception ==
To the Moon and Back ratings
Review scores
Source	Rating
Crack	8/10
The Irish Times	4/5 stars
Mojo	4/5 stars

Pitchfork's Philip Sherburne called Alva Noto's rendition of "The Sheltering Sky" "one of the simplest yet most moving pieces" of the album which "represents a captivating fusion of the two men's sensibilities." Sherburne also called other cuts "remarkable", including those from Sylvian, Guðnadóttir, and Fennesz.

== Track listing ==
All tracks are written by Ryuichi Sakamoto with additional writers noted.

To the Moon and Back track listing
No.	Title	Writer(s)	Artist	Length
1.	"Walker" (from Async)		Lim Giong	4:42
2.	"Grains (Sweet Paulownia Wood)" (from utp_)	Carsten Nicolai	David Sylvian	7:13
3.	"Thousand Knives" (from the album of the same name)		Thundercat	5:26
4.	"Merry Christmas Mr. Lawrence"		Electric Youth	5:09
5.	"Thatness & Thereness" (from B-2 Unit)		Cornelius	3:35
6.	"World Citizen I Won't Be Disappointed" (from the World Citizen EP)	Hildur Guðnadóttir; Skúli Sverrisson	Guðnadóttir	5:42
7.	"The Sheltering Sky" (from the soundtrack of the same name)		Alva Noto	4:49
8.	"Amore" (from Beauty)	Arto Lindsay	Fennesz	4:40
9.	"Choral No 1" (from Sakamoto: For Mr. Lawrence Piano Music)		Devonté Hynes featuring Emily Schubert	3:02
10.	"DNA" (from the Tony Takitani soundtrack)		The Cinematic Orchestra	4:32
11.	"With Snow & Moonlight" (from Snow, Silence, Partially Sunny by Sachiko M)	Sachiko M	Otomo Yoshihide	12:49
12.	"Forbidden Colours"	David Sylvian	Gabrial Wek	6:35
13.	"The Revenant Main Theme" (from The Revenant soundtrack)		404.Zero	3:53
Total length:				72:07

== Personnel ==
- Ryuichi Sakamoto – producer
- Lim Giong – producer (1)
- David Sylvian – producer (2)
- Thundercat – producer (3)
- Taylor Graves – producer (3)
- Vic Wainstein – engineer (3)
- Electric Youth – producer (4)
- Cornelius – producer (5)
- Toyoaki Mishima – mixing engineer (5)
- Hildur Guðnadóttir – recording engineer (6)
- Skúli Sverrisson – recording engineer (6)
- Sam Slater – mixing engineer (6)
- Alva Noto – producer (7)
- Fennesz – producer (8)
- Devonté Hynes – producer (9)
- Emily Schubert – vocals, vocal producer (9)
- The Cinematic Orchestra – producer (10)
- Otomo Yoshihide – producer (11)
- 404.Zero – producer (13)
- Francesco Fabris – mixing engineer (13)
