= Cinemage =

Live album by Ryuichi Sakamoto
- Released: 1999 (US) February 8, 2000 (Europe)
- Recorded: September 1998
- Venue: Takemitsu Memorial Hall, Tokyo
- Genre: Classical
- Length: 48:00
- Label: Sony Classical

Cinemage is a 1999 album by Ryuichi Sakamoto. It is a collection of six of his works for film soundtracks and events.

== Background ==
Cinemage was recorded live while Sakamoto toured Japan with his orchestra in 1997-98. The album was originally set to be released in fall 1999 but was delayed because Sakamoto was working on his first opera, LIFE. It was eventually released alongside another album, BTTB.

Sakamoto said the rearrangements on Cinemage were meant to "see if my music could stand up on its own." "El Mar Mediterrani" was composed for the 1992 Barcelona Olympic Games. David Sylvian sings on "Forbidden Colours," originally in Merry Christmas, Mr. Lawrence, and recorded new vocal parts in the studio after the live performances. Sakamoto merged the two vocal tracks for Cinemage.

== Critical reception ==
The album received mixed reviews. Billboard praised it alongside several of Sakamoto's other CDs, while CMJ New Music Monthly and All Music Guide compared it unfavorably to Sakamoto's previous works.

== Track listing ==
1. "Forbidden Colours" – 4:48
2. "The Last Emperor" – 5:17
3. "Little Buddha" – 8:48
4. "Wuthering Heights" – 7:03
5. "Replica" – 4:50
6. "El Mar Mediterrani" – 17:17

== Personnel ==
- Ryuichi Sakamoto – piano, conductor
- Yutaka Sado – conductor
- David Sylvian – vocals (1)
- DJ Spooky – guitar (6)
- David Torn – texture (6)
