= Chasm (Ryuichi Sakamoto album) =

Studio album by Ryuichi Sakamoto
- Released: February 25, 2004 (Japan)
- Genres: Ambient; electronica
- Length: 72:14
- Label: Warner Music Japan
- Producers: Ryuichi Sakamoto; Arto Lindsay

Ryuichi Sakamoto chronology
US (2004)	Chasm (2004)	/04 (2004)

Professional ratings
Review scores
Source	Rating
AllMusic	3.5/5 stars

Chasm (stylized as CHASM) is the 15th studio album by Ryuichi Sakamoto and was released on February 25, 2004 via Warner Music Japan.

== Background ==
The album is combining experimental and pop, pairing Sakamoto's piano work with ambient and glitch programming. Notably, Sakamoto's former bandmates from Yellow Magic Orchestra, Haruomi Hosono and Yukihiro Takahashi, contribute on several songs under their own production name, Sketch Show.

The song "coro" was featured on the soundtrack to the anime film Appleseed, while "World Citizen - i won't be disappointed/looped piano" and "only love can conquer hate" were featured in the film Babel. The original version of "Ngo", featured on the single for "Undercooled", was used in a New Balance advertisement. "Seven Samurai - ending theme" is taken from Sakamoto's score for the PlayStation 2 game Seven Samurai 20XX.

The US version of the album replaces "the land song" with two pieces, "song" and "word". A single vinyl edition was also released, containing ten of the original fourteen songs.

== Track listing ==
All tracks are written by Ryuichi Sakamoto and are instrumental, except where noted.

No.	Title	Lyrics	Music	Length
1.	"undercooled"	MC Sniper		4:32
2.	"coro"			4:05
3.	"War & Peace"	Sakamoto; Arto Lindsay		5:31
4.	"CHASM"			3:30
5.	"World Citizen - I won't be disappointed" (looped piano)	David Sylvian	Sylvian; Sakamoto	6:05
6.	"only love can conquer hate"			9:47
7.	"Ngo" (bitmix)	Sakamoto; Brazilian Portuguese translation: Maúcha Adnet		5:10
8.	"break with"			4:35
9.	"+pantonal"			3:58
10.	"the land song - music for Artelligent City" (one winter day mix)			5:08
11.	"20 msec."			5:32
12.	"laménto"			3:43
13.	"World Citizen" (re-cycled)	Sylvian	Sylvian	4:57
14.	"Seven Samurai - ending theme" (music for PS2 game "Seven Samurai 20XX")			5:41
Total length:				72:14

=== International version ===
No.	Title	Length
1.	"undercooled"	4:32
2.	"coro"	4:05
3.	"War & Peace"	5:31
4.	"CHASM"	3:30
5.	"World Citizen - I won't be disappointed" (looped piano)	6:05
6.	"only love can conquer hate"	9:47
7.	"Ngo" (bitmix)	5:10
8.	"break with"	4:35
9.	"+pantonal"	3:58
10.	"20 msec."	5:32
11.	"laménto"	3:43
12.	"World Citizen" (re-cycled)	4:57
13.	"Song"	4:30
14.	"Word"	5:00
15.	"Seven Samurai - ending theme" (music for PS2 game "Seven Samurai 20XX")	5:41
Total length:		76:36

=== Vinyl version ===
Side A
No.	Title	Length
1.	"undercooled"	4:32
2.	"coro"	4:05
3.	"War & Peace"	5:31
4.	"World Citizen - I won't be disappointed" (looped piano)	6:05
5.	"Ngo" (bitmix)	5:10
Total length:		25:23

Side B
No.	Title	Length
1.	"+pantonal"	3:58
2.	"the land song - music for Artelligent City" (one winter day mix)	5:08
3.	"20 msec."	5:32
4.	"World Citizen" (re-cycled)	4:57
5.	"Seven Samurai - ending theme" (music for PS2 game "Seven Samurai 20XX")	5:41
Total length:		25:16 (50:39)

== Personnel ==
- Ryuichi Sakamoto – all piano and keyboards; producer of all songs except "War & Peace"
- Sketch Show – sound programming on "Undercooled", "War & Peace", "World Citizen – i won't be disappointed/looped piano" and "Ngo / bitmix"
- David Sylvian – vocals and lyrics on both "World Citizen" tracks
- Keigo Oyamada – guitar on "Undercooled" and "World Citizen / re-cycled"; CDJ-800 on "World Citizen – i won't be disappointed/looped piano"
- Luiz Brasil – guitar on "Undercooled" and "War & Peace"
- Amadeo Pace – guitar on "World Citizen – i won't be disappointed/looped piano"
- Jaques Morelenbaum – cello on "Undercooled" and "War & Peace"
- MC Sniper – vocals on "Undercooled"
- Maucha Adnet – vocals on "Ngo / bitmix"
- Haruomi Hosono – medicine drum on "War & Peace"
- Arto Lindsay – producer of "Undercooled" and "War & Peace"
- Ryoji Ikeda – "processing" on "World Citizen / re-cycled"
- Marcelo Costa – percussion on "War & Peace"
- Cao Xue Jing – erhu on "Undercooled"
- Carlos Núñez – whistle on "The Land Song"
- Jiang Jian Hua – erhu on "Break With" and "Seven Samurai – ending theme"
- Jan Xiao-Qing – gu zheng on "Seven Samurai – ending theme"
- Aya Motohashi – hichiriki on "The Land Song" and "Seven Samurai – ending theme"
- Dozan Fujiwara – shakuhachi on "Seven Samurai – ending theme"
