= BTTB =

BTTB may refer to:

- Bangladesh Telegraph and Telephone Board, a historical name of Bangladesh Telecommunications Company Limited
- BTTB (album), by Ryuichi Sakamoto
- Back to the Beginning, a 2025 Black Sabbath concert
