= Sketch show (disambiguation) =

A sketch show is a series of short comedy scenes or vignettes.

It may also refer to:

- The Sketch Show, an English TV programme
- Sketch Show (band), a Japanese band
