= Tronika =

tronika

EP by Sketch Show
- Released: February 26, 2003
- Genres: Electronica, Glitch Pop
- Length: 36:15
- Labels: avex, cutting edge, daisyworld discs
- Producer: Audio Sponge

Sketch Show chronology
Audio Sponge (2002)	tronika (2003)	Wild Sketch Show (2003)

Tronika is a 2003 mini album by Japanese electronic duo Sketch Show; it also features remixes by Cornelius. Two tracks, "chronograph" and the Cornelius remix of "ekot", appeared in the album Loophole; "night talker," in a remixed form by Safety Scissors, was also included in Loophole. "ekot" and "chronograph" (both original and remixed versions) were released on a 12-inch vinyl single.

== Track listing ==
All lyrics are written by Haruomi Hosono and Yukihiro Takahashi, except "Night Talker", by Takahashi; all music is composed by Hosono and Takahashi.

No.	Title	Length
1.	"ekot"	5:37
2.	"chronograph"	5:09
3.	"snow #1"	1:23
4.	"night talker"	4:54
5.	"snow #2"	1:08
6.	"ohotzka"	4:11
7.	"chronograph" (Cornelius Remix)	5:56
8.	"snow #3"	1:52
9.	"ekot" (Cornelius Remix)	6:07
