= Energy flow =

Energy flow may refer to:

- Energy transfer, the transfer of physical energy from one body or place to another
- Energy flow (ecology), the flow of energy through a biological food chain
- Energy (esotericism) flow, the movement of spiritual energy
- Fluid dynamics, energy of a flowing fluid related to pressure
- "Energy Flow", a 1999 song by Ryuichi Sakamoto

== See also ==
- Ecological energetics
