= Loophole (disambiguation) =

A loophole is a weakness that allows a system to be circumvented.

Loophole may also refer to:

- Loophole (firearm), a protected small opening to discharge a firearm
- "Loophole" (short story), a short science fiction story by Arthur C. Clarke
- Loopholes in Bell test experiments, an explanation for the outcome of certain experiments
- Arrowslit, a loophole in a castle wall to launch arrows

== Film ==
- Loophole (1954 film), a film about a bank teller
- Loophole (1981 film), a film about a bank robbery
- Loophole (2017 film), a film starring Chloe Lukasiak

== Television ==
- "Loophole" (Law & Order: Special Victims Unit), an episode of Law & Order: Special Victims Unit
- "The Loophole" (The Amazing World of Gumball), an episode of The Amazing World of Gumball

== Music ==
- Loophole (album), the 2003 album by Sketch Show
- Loophole (Murlocs album), the 2014 debut studio album of the Murlocs
- Loophole (Michael Head & The Red Elastic Band album), a 2024 album by Michael Head & The Red Elastic Band
