= Wild Sketch Show =

Video by Sketch Show
- Released: September 25, 2003
- Recorded: 3, 8, 9 December 2002
- Venues: Shibuya-AX, Jinnan, Shibuya, Tokyo
- Genres: Electronica, Glitch Pop
- Labels: avex, cutting edge, daisyworld discs
- Producer: Audio Sponge

Sketch Show chronology
Tronika (2003)	Wild Sketch Show (2003)	Loophole (2003)

Wild Sketch Show is a live video album released by Sketch Show on September 25, 2003. It features a mix of Sketch Show songs (nine from Audio Sponge, four from Tronika and one song that has been never released in studio form) and Yellow Magic Orchestra songs performed in the Sketch Show style (one from Paraiso, one from BGM and two from Technodelic). Sketch Show were joined by fellow YMO member Ryuichi Sakamoto (which turned Sketch Show into Human Audio Sponge), as well as two guitarists and two keyboardists. This is the only live show released under Sketch Show's name (later releases featured the same members and style, but were released under YMO).

== Track listing ==
All tracks are written by Haruomi Hosono and Yukihiro Takahashi, except where noted.

No.	Title	Lyrics	Music	Length
1.	"Reform"	instrumental
2.	"Ekot"
3.	"Do You Want to Marry Me"	Corinne Tulipe	Michel Magne
4.	"Supreme Secret"		Hosono, Ryuichi Sakamoto, Takahashi
5.	"Night Talker"	Takahashi
6.	"Ohotzka"	instrumental
7.	"Wilson"	Takahashi
8.	"Graduated Grey" (灰色(グレイ)の段階 Gurei no Dankai)	Hosono, Peter Barakan	Hosono
9.	"Wonderful to Me"		Hosono, Sakamoto, Takahashi
10.	"Chronograph"
11.	"Turn Turn"
12.	"Microtalk"	instrumental
13.	"Flying George"	Takahashi
14.	"Return"
15.	"Zoetrope"	instrumental
16.	"Pure Jam" (ジャム Jamu)	Takahashi, Barakan	Takahashi
17.	"Cue"	Hosono, Takahashi, Barakan
18.	"Paraiso" (はらいそ Haraiso)	Hosono	Hosono

== Personnel ==
- Haruomi Hosono – Bass, Keyboards, Vocals
- Ryuichi Sakamoto – Keyboards, Vocals
- Yukihiro Takahashi – Drums, Percussion, Vocals, Keyboards
- Cornelius & Hirofumi Tokutake – Guitars
- Hirohisa Horie & Junko Tanaka – Keyboards
