= After Yang (soundtrack) =

2022 film soundtrack album

After Yang (Original Motion Picture Soundtrack)

Film score by Aska Matsumiya and Ryuichi Sakamoto
- Released: March 4, 2022
- Recorded: 2020–2022
- Genre: Film score
- Length: 43:50
- Label: Milan
- Producers: Black Cat White Cat; Seiya Matsumiya; Aska Matsumiya

Aska Matsumiya chronology
Bruised (2021)	After Yang (2022)	Phoenix Rising (2022)

Ryuichi Sakamoto chronology
Minamata (2021)	After Yang (2022)	Exception (2022)

After Yang (Original Motion Picture Soundtrack) is the film score to the 2022 science fiction drama film After Yang directed by Kogonada stars Colin Farrell, Jodie Turner-Smith, Justin H. Min, Malea Emma Tjandrawidjaja, and Haley Lu Richardson. The soundtrack featured Aska Matsumiya and a theme contributed by Ryuichi Sakamoto. The score utilizes piano, cello, marimba and synths, along with AI programming techniques to provide futuristic sounds. The album was released through Milan Records on March 4, 2022.

== Background ==
The original score is composed by Aska Matsumiya and a theme contributed by Ryuichi Sakamoto. Matsumiya was tasked to create a sound that was novel and futuristic but also emotional, that accompanied the paradox setting of the essence of humanity despite the futuristic setting. Hence, soft wooden instrumentation is juxtaposed with synths and processed with machine learning to achieve the same. Much of the melodies and themes for the film derived from the robotic teenager Yang, which intended for the audience to feel the robot's presence throughout the film and a simplistic piano melody underlined the internal journey of Yang.

Matsumiya took a "melody-first" approach with Yang's opening theme served as the core of the film and built using different instruments and variations, such as strings and percussions, being arranged for the themes. Matsumiya added for a scene where Jake discovered a memory box in Yang's hand, had utilized an AI plugin that blurred organ melodies with electronic and bleeps to indicate the robot trying to make sense of human inputs. The AI plugin was created and programmed by Lucky Dragons frontman Luke Fischbeck, with several variations of the music incorporated through the system until the AI recognized the sound patterns.

Sakamoto, who separately worked on the project, created the four minute classical composition "Memory Bank" to indicate Yang's relationship with the clone Ada; the piece opens with a piano melody that breaks into a full-fledged string arrangement reminiscing the chord progressions of his soundtrack for Merry Christmas, Mr. Lawrence (1983). Sakamoto shared the track with Matsumiya in the beginning of the scoring process, and did a few variations based on his melody. Matsumiya added that despite Sakamoto's involvement was not being a collaboration, both shared the same platform for the musical soundscape which reflected on the working process.

Besides the score, the film featured a cover of the song "Glide" performed by Mitski, which was originally recorded for the Japanese film All About Lily Chou-Chou (2001).

== Release ==
The soundtrack was released through Milan Records on March 4, 2022. A vinyl edition of the album was published by Mondo.

== Reception ==
David Rooney of The Hollywood Reporter added that "the mix of composer Aska Matsumiya’s melancholy score, used with an original theme by Ryuichi Sakamoto" shapes the emotions towards the scenes and the way characters interact. Paul Bradshaw of NME called it an "ambient synth score" that flowed smoothly with the film. SciFiNow stated "A dreamy score by Aska Matsumiya that includes a theme by Ryuichi Sakamoto [...] further heightens the melancholic ambiance." Brian Tallerico of RogerEbert.com described it a "gorgeous music by ASKA and Ryuichi Sakamoto".

Esther Zuckerman of Thrillist added that "[the film's] beauty is augmented with a theme by the great composer Ryuichi Sakamoto [and] a score by musician Aska Matsumiya". Natalia Keogan of Paste wrote "Japanese electronic music composer Ryuichi Sakamoto contributed to the film’s score alongside Aska Matsumiya, conjuring a dreamlike sound that feels distinctly futuristic." Isaac Feldberg of Inverse called it an "elegiac score". Siddhant Adlakha of IGN wrote "The music by Aska Matsumiya (with one theme by the legendary Ryuichu Sakamoto) is sweet and wistful."

Emma Madden of Crack described it as "one of the greatest film scores of the 21st century" ranking at number 47. She stated, "For this film probing humanity’s future, Aska Matsumiya fed her compositions – including a contribution from Ryuichi Sakamoto – into AI, yielding something futuristic yet unmistakably human."

== Track listing ==
No.	Title	Artist(s)	Length
1.	"In My Breath"		1:00
2.	"Welcome to Family of 4"		2:46
3.	"Yang & Mika"		2:53
4.	"Chasing Yesterday"		2:38
5.	"Mizuiro Memory" (A.I. Version)		3:45
6.	"Yang & Mika" (A.I. Version)		3:40
7.	"Ada's Synth"		1:07
8.	"Butterflies"		4:14
9.	"In the World of My Breath"		2:25
10.	"Yang Eternal" (A.I. Version)		3:45
11.	"Memories of Ada"		1:23
12.	"In My Breath Again"		1:56
13.	"Mizuiro"		3:50
14.	"After the Rain"		2:32
15.	"Memory Bank"	Ryuichi Sakamoto	4:16
16.	"The End Walk"	feat. Rhye	1:40
Total length:			43:50

== Chart performance ==
Chart (2022)	Peak position
UK Soundtrack Albums (OCC)	46
US Top Soundtracks (Billboard)	22

== Accolades ==
Award	Date of ceremony	Category	Recipient(s)	Result	Ref.
International Film Music Critics Association Awards	February 23, 2023	Best Original Score for a Fantasy/Science Fiction/Horror Film	Alexandre Desplat	Nominated	
