= Playing the Piano =

Compilation album by Ryuichi Sakamoto
- Released: 23 September 2009
- Labels: KAB America (Japan); Decca Label Group (North America)
- Producer: Ryuichi Sakamoto

Ryuichi Sakamoto chronology
Out of Noise (2009)	Playing the Piano (2009)	Summvs (2011)

Playing the Piano is a concept album by Ryuichi Sakamoto which was first released in Japan in 2009. The album includes recordings released in Japan only in 2004 under the /04 and /05 releases. The album is completely instrumental and features Sakamoto covering his earlier work, such as the soundtracks to Merry Christmas, Mr. Lawrence and The Last Emperor, and also pop songs such as "Thousand Knives", by rearranging them to be played on a single piano. Sakamoto himself refers to the album as a "self covers" album. In North America it was released as a deluxe double album along with the experimental album Out of Noise on 28 September 2010. Sakamoto promoted the album in North America with an 11-date tour in October and November 2010.

== Reception ==
Professional ratings
Review scores
Source	Rating
AllMusic	3.5/5 stars
PopMatters	8/10 stars

AllMusic reviewer Thom Jurek states "For the most part, it is a spare and lovely beauty of an album, with few surprises save for the elegance that Sakamoto performs these indelible pieces with". PopMatters John Garrett noted "An important selling point for Playing the Piano is how Ryuichi Sakamoto takes the opportunity to "cover himself", so to speak. His soundtrack work is up for grabs as well as a fantastic pre-Yellow Magic Orchestra composition called "Thousand Knives". The advantage of this is that Sakamoto boils these pieces down to their skeletal form, presenting them to the listener in a way that's probably close to how he was writing them all these years ago". The album hit No.5 in Gaon International Music Chart.

== Track listing ==
All compositions by Ryuichi Sakamoto.

1. "Amore" – 5:07
2. "Merry Christmas Mr. Lawrence" – 4:41
3. "A Flower Is Not a Flower" – 6:34
4. "The Sheltering Sky" – 4:54
5. "Tamago 2004" – 2:50
6. "The Last Emperor" – 6:43
7. "Tibetan Dance" – 4:23
8. "Thousand Knives" – 5:22
9. "Riot in Lagos" – 4:35
10. "Reversing." – 3:31
11. "Mizu no Naka no Bagatelle" – 3:46
12. "Bolerish" – 5:09

== Personnel ==
- Ryuichi Sakamoto – piano

== Charts ==
Weekly chart performance for Playing The Piano
Chart (2009)	Peak position
Italian Albums (FIMI)	36
Spanish Albums (Promusicae)	52
Greek Albums (IFPI)	31
