= Monster (2023 soundtrack) =

Monster (Original Motion Picture Soundtrack)

Film score by Ryuichi Sakamoto
- Released: September 8, 2023
- Genre: Film score
- Length: 36:50
- Label: Milan
- Producer: Ryuichi Sakamoto

Ryuichi Sakamoto chronology
12 (2023)	Monster (2023)

Monster (Original Motion Picture Soundtrack) is the soundtrack to the 2023 film of the same name directed and edited by Hirokazu Kore-eda. The soundtrack featured seven songs that consisted of previous compositions from Japanese composer Ryuichi Sakamoto, although he created two piano pieces for the film. The film marked Sakamoto's final composition before his death on March 28, 2023. The soundtrack was released posthumously on September 8 through Milan Records.

== Development ==
In January 2023, Sakamoto was announced as the music composer for the film. Kore-eda thought of Sakamoto's music during the production and felt that he would be apt for scoring the film, after a previous collaboration in the past decade failed to come into fruition. While editing the film, Kore-eda listened to Sakamoto's music and assembled an initial cut with tracks from the musician’s older albums, which he sent to Sakamoto, who replied that ”it was very good”.

Sakamoto, who was diagnosed with rectal cancer since 2021, felt that he did not have the physical strength to accept scoring an entire film. Instead, he contributed two new piano cues as per the request of the director. The soundtrack also includes another two piano pieces from his studio album 12 and older compositions. In a commentary, Sakamoto stated that the film deals with an "esoteric theme" and that it was difficult to discern who the eponymous "monster" was.

While most of the cues are led by piano music, a sequence where Minato and the school principal play trombones and French horns developed a sonic contrast, which Kore-eda attributed to its climatic and emotional importance, and he felt that the use of a trombone as an expressive instrument at the core of the film would attribute it for emotional connectivity. The sounds of nature also felt integral to the musical soundscape, as with the plot starts with fire and ends with water, Kore-eda worked with the recording department to carefully differentiate the use of the nature sounds, resulted in its coexistence with Sakamoto's score.

== Critical reception ==
Peter Bradshaw of The Guardian stated that Sakamoto's score "creates a layer of nuance and meaning. Its plangent, sad piano chords will often counterintuitively be added to a scene of apparent drama or tension, implying that the meaning of this scene has not yet been disclosed." Natalia Winkelman of The New York Times said that Sakamoto's "aching score" makes the film "lovingly detailed and accented". Simon Abrams of RogerEbert.com wrote "Sakamoto's music swoons and pulses with a subtle and, in his words, 'esoteric' complexity. His playing beautifully expresses Minato and his loved ones’ mutual loneliness without succumbing to treacly conventions or platitudes. It's mood music, which can be easy to take for granted in a movie where the plot seems most important." David Rooney of The Hollywood Reporter deciphered it as a "gentle score" that accompanies the drama. Matthew Turner of NME wrote "The late composer's music adds heft to this twisty-turny Japanese drama".

Dave Calhoun of Time Out wrote "Ryuichi Sakamoto only adds to the overarching air of thoughtfulness and empathy". Nadir Samara of Screen Rant wrote "The sweeping score utilizes itself to transport the viewer into a world of confusion but to the tune of a graceful piano and sharp strings that pierce through the screen." Bilge Ebiri of Vulture wrote Sakamoto's "delicate piano pieces" adds to the "film's heartbreaking fragility". Meg Shields of Film School Rejects wrote "Sakamoto leaves behind a brilliant final score as heartfelt and tender" and called the track "20220207" is especially "bittersweet" as a "warped shadow of Wendy Carlos' main title theme for The Shining (1980), flecked with inquisitive warmth and playfulness". Pete Hammond of Deadline Hollywood called it as "a moving final musical score that turns out to be pitch perfect here". Tomris Laffly of TheWrap wrote "Ryuichi Sakamoto's mournful score of high-keys and strings, coddling the tale soulfully as one of the final compositions of his peerless career."

== Track listing ==
Monster (Original Motion Picture Soundtrack) track listing
No.	Title	Length
1.	"20220207"	7:02
2.	"Monster 1"	3:56
3.	"hwit"	6:30
4.	"Monster 2"	2:55
5.	"20220302"	2:51
6.	"hibari"	9:03
7.	"Aqua"	4:33
Total length:		36:50

== Accolades ==
Accolades for Monster (Original Motion Picture Soundtrack)
Award	Date of ceremony	Category	Recipient(s)	Result	Ref.
Japan Academy Film Prize	8 March 2024	Best Music	Ryuichi Sakamoto	Nominated	
Japan Academy Film Prize	8 March 2024	Best Sound Recording	Kazuhiko Tomita	Nominated	
Mainichi Film Awards	14 February 2024	Best Music	Ryuichi Sakamoto	Nominated	
Mainichi Film Awards	14 February 2024	Best Sound Recording	Kazuhiko Tomita	Nominated	
