= Out of Noise (Ryuichi Sakamoto album) =

Studio album by Ryuichi Sakamoto
- Released: March 4, 2009
- Genres: Abstract, modern classical, experimental, ambient, minimal
- Length: 65:00
- Label: Commmons
- Producer: Ryuichi Sakamoto

Ryuichi Sakamoto chronology
/05 (2005)	Out of Noise (2009)	Playing the Piano (2009)

Professional ratings
Review scores
Source	Rating
AllMusic	4/5 stars
PopMatters	8/10
Record Collector	3/5 stars

Out of Noise is a studio album by Jananese musician Ryuichi Sakamoto. The album was released on March 4, 2009, via the Commmons label. This is his first release on a new label and marks a significant departure from traditional piano compositions towards ambient and experimental music based on field recordings made in the Arctic.

In 2010, Out of Noise became available in the United States as part of the double album Playing the Piano / Out of Noise, released by Decca.

== Background ==
The concept of the album was strongly influenced by Sakamoto's trip to Greenland in 2008 as part of the Cape Farewell project dedicated to studying climate change. During the expedition, the composer recorded sounds on the surface of a glacier and underwater in the Arctic Ocean. These field recordings became the basis for several tracks, in particular "Ice" and "Glacier". Musically, Out of Noise is notable for the fact that this is Sakamoto's first solo album in which he completely abandoned the use of synthesizers. The sound is based on piano, field recordings, and acoustic instruments.

== Reception ==
Mark Deming of AllMusic stated: "During his stay in Greenland, Sakamoto made a number of field recordings that he incorporated into his album Out of Noise; the album is dominated by graceful, minimalist keyboard pieces punctuated by electronic noise, ambient sounds and bits of found voices." Alessandro Michelucci of Expose Online wrote: "...Out of Noise, is more experimental. It was conceived as part of a live performance that could only be purchased through iTunes. The twelve instrumental tracks range from experimentalism (“Tama”) to minimalism (“Hibari”)."

Mark Saleski of All About Jazz added: "Out Of Noise is the kind of music that can take a long time to unfold in the listener's head. The great thing is that subsequent listening sessions freely provide “new" details: exactly like an ever-changing glacier, even better—exactly like those decaying fragments the go on forever after the music has stopped."

== Track listing ==
All tracks are written by Ryuichi Sakamoto.

No.	Title	Length
1.	"Hibari"	9:02
2.	"Hwit"	6:29
3.	"Still Life"	4:44
4.	"In the Red"	5:32
5.	"Tama"	4:01
6.	"Nostalgia"	3:38
7.	"Firewater"	4:10
8.	"Disko"	3:37
9.	"Ice"	3:34
10.	"Glacier"	9:40
11.	"Composition 0919"	6:08
12.	"081121_high"	4:25
Total length:		65:00

== Personnel ==
- Ryuichi Sakamoto – pPiano, keyboards, electronics
- Fretwork – viols
- Hirotaka Shimizu – guitar
- Tamami Tohno – shō
- Christian Fennesz – guitar
- Keigo Oyamada – guitar
- Ren Takada – pedal steel guitar
- Rob Moose – violin
- Neo – guitar
- Dana Tateo Leong – cello, trombone
- Skúli Sverrisson – dobro
- Karen H. Filskov – voice

== Charts ==
Chart (2009)	Peak position
Japanese Albums (Oricon)	16
