= Daijōbu, My Friend =

- Film poster
- Directed by: Ryū Murakami
- Screenplay by: Ryū Murakami
- Based on: Daijōbu, My Friend by Ryū Murakami
- Produced by: Hidenori Taga; Kiichi Ichikawa
- Starring: Peter Fonda; Reona Hirota; Hiroyuki Watanabe
- Cinematography: Kōzō Okazaki
- Edited by: Sachiko Yamaji
- Music by: Ryuichi Sakamoto
- Production company: Kitty Films
- Release date: 15 April 1983 (Japan)
- Running time: 119 minutes
- Country: Japan
- Language: Japanese

Daijōbu, My Friend (Japanese: だいじょうぶマイ・フレンド, Hepburn: Daijōbu, Mai Furendo; lit. "It's All Right, My Friend") is a 1983 Japanese film starring Peter Fonda as a superhero called Gonzy Traumerai. The film, written and directed by Ryū Murakami, is based on his own novel of the same name (which was published the same year). It is a parody of such films as Superman, E.T. the Extra-Terrestrial, and Attack of the Killer Tomatoes.

== Cast ==
- Peter Fonda as Gonzy Traumerai
- Reona Hirota as Mimimi
- Hiroyuki Watanabe as Hachi

== Music ==
The film features a soundtrack by Ryuichi Sakamoto, his second film work after Merry Christmas, Mr Lawrence, although the film was released before the latter.
