= Merry Christmas Mr. Lawrence (soundtrack) =

Soundtrack album by Ryuichi Sakamoto
- Released: 1 May 1983
- Recorded: 1983
- Studio: Onkio Haus, Tokyo, Japan
- Genre: Electronic; ambient
- Length: 40:57
- Label: Virgin
- Producer: Sakamoto; Seigen Ono; Shinichi Tanaka

Ryuichi Sakamoto chronology
Left-Handed Dream (1981)	Merry Christmas Mr. Lawrence (1983)	Coda (1983)

Singles from Merry Christmas Mr. Lawrence
- 1. "Forbidden Colours" Released: 24 June 1983; 2. "Merry Christmas Mr. Lawrence" Released: September 1983

Digital edition cover
- Illustration depicting Sakamoto and David Bowie

Professional ratings
Review scores
Source	Rating
AllMusic	2.5/5 stars
Encyclopedia of Popular Music	3/5 stars
Smash Hits	6/10

Merry Christmas Mr. Lawrence is the soundtrack from the 1983 film Merry Christmas, Mr. Lawrence, released on 1 May 1983 in Japan and in August 1983 in the UK. It was composed by Ryuichi Sakamoto, who also starred in the film. It was Sakamoto's first film score, though it was released several weeks after the film Daijōbu, My Friend, for which he also composed the music.

Despite receiving mixed reviews from critics, the film has since become a cult classic, largely due to its soundtrack. For the film's soundtrack, Sakamoto won the 1984 BAFTA Award for Best Film Music as well as the 1984 Mainichi Film Award for Best Film Score. David Sylvian contributed lyrics and vocals on "Forbidden Colours", a vocal version of the main theme, "Merry Christmas Mr. Lawrence", both of which were released as singles. A special 30th anniversary edition, which included a second CD of tracks, was released in November 2013 in Japan.

== Track listing ==
All tracks are written by Ryuichi Sakamoto, except where noted.

Side one
No.	Title	Writer(s)	Length
1.	"Merry Christmas Mr. Lawrence"		4:34
2.	"Batavia"		1:18
3.	"Germination"		1:47
4.	"A Hearty Breakfast"		1:21
5.	"Before the War"		2:14
6.	"The Seed and the Sower"		5:03
7.	"A Brief Encounter"		2:23
8.	"Ride Ride Ride (Celliers' Brother's Song)"	Stephen McCurdy	1:03
9.	"The Fight"		1:29

Side two
No.	Title	Writer(s)	Length
10.	"Father Christmas"		2:00
11.	"Dismissed!"		0:10
12.	"Assembly"		2:16
13.	"Beyond Reason"		2:01
14.	"Sowing the Seed"		1:53
15.	"23rd Psalm"	Traditional	2:00
16.	"Last Regrets"		2:40
17.	"Ride Ride Ride" (Reprise)	McCurdy	3:29
18.	"The Seed"		1:02
19.	"Forbidden Colours" (with David Sylvian)	Sakamoto, Sylvian	4:43
Total length:			40:57

2013 Japanese bonus CD
No.	Title	Length
1.	"Batavia" (M-3)	0:48
2.	"Merry Christmas Mr. Lawrence" (M-34)	5:34
3.	"Germination" (M-9)	1:29
4.	"Germination" (M-11)	1:13
5.	"The Seed and the Sower" (M-16A)	0:40
6.	"M-7"	0:24
7.	"M-10"	1:54
8.	"The Seed and the Sower" (M-16)	0:40
9.	"A Brief Encounter" (M17)	0:29
10.	"The Fight"	0:29
11.	"Last Regrets" (M-20 and M-22)	1:51
12.	"Father Christmas" (M-23)	2:10
13.	"Before the War"	0:18
14.	"M-14"	0:19
15.	"Dismissed!"	0:27
16.	"Beyond Reason" (M-26 to M-27 Take 2)	2:04
17.	"M-29"	0:30
18.	"The Seed" (M-29)	0:37
19.	"The Seed" (M-33)	1:07
20.	"Last Regrets" (Take 2)	2:11
21.	"M-28A Take 2"	0:44
22.	"M-1 Free Time"	3:05
23.	"23rd Psalm" (M-30 Take 2 Inst)	2:06
24.	"M-13"	3:08
25.	"Ride Ride Ride" (M-18 Inst)	1:09
26.	"Merry Christmas Mr. Lawrence" (Theme Five Time Take 1)	4:43

== Personnel ==
- Ryuichi Sakamoto – instrumentation, recording, mixing, producer
- David Sylvian – vocals (track 19)
- Seigen Ono – recording, mixing, producer
- Shinichi Tanaka – recording, mixing, producer
- Michio Nakakoshi – recording assistant, mixing assistant
- Hiroshi Okura – recording supervisor
- Peter Barakan – recording supervisor

== Charts ==
Chart (1983)	Peak position
Australia (Kent Music Report)	40
Iceland (Dagblaðið Vísir)	7
Japanese Albums (Oricon)	8
Dutch Albums (Album Top 100)	8
New Zealand Albums (RMNZ)	38
Swedish Albums (Sverigetopplistan)	30
UK Albums (OCC)	36

Chart (1988)	Peak position
Japanese Albums (Oricon)	49

== Release history ==
Country	Date	Format	Label	Ref.
Japan	1 May 1983	LP	London	
Various	August–October 1983	LP, MC	Virgin, MCA	
Australia	1985	CD	Virgin	
Japan	5 December 1985	CD	London	
Japan	9 March 1988	CD, LP, MC	Midi	
UK	1988	CD, LP	Virgin	
Japan	21 September 1993	CD	Midi	
US & Europe	October 1994	CD, MC	Milan	
Japan	11 November 2013	2xCD	Midi	
France	23 March 2015	CD, digital download	Milan	
US & France	21 October 2016	CD, LP, digital download	Milan	
