= /05 =

Studio album by Ryuichi Sakamoto
- Released: September 28, 2005
- Studio: Right Track Recording
- Genre: Classical
- Length: 66:00
- Label: Warner Music Japan
- Producer: Ryuichi Sakamoto

Ryuichi Sakamoto chronology
/04 (2004)	/05 (2005)	Out of Noise (2009)

/05 is a studio album by Jananese musician and composer Ryuichi Sakamoto. It was released on September 28, 2005 via the Warner Music Japan label. The album is a continuation of his previous work /04 released in 2004 and is a collection of self-covers—new piano arrangements of his own compositions created during different periods of his career.

== Background ==
After the release of /04, which, according to the label's description, was conceived as a "healing" piano collection, Sakamoto decided to develop this idea. In /05 he re-recorded all the compositions anew, focusing on piano performance and extreme relaxation. Unlike its predecessor, 05 turned out to be more contemplative and philosophical. /05 includes 14 tracks covering a wide range of Sakamoto's work: from film music to solo works and compositions from the Yellow Magic Orchestra era. All the tracks have been performed primarily on the piano, often in solo sound, exposing their melodic and harmonic structure.

In 2009, some of the materials from /04 and /05 were re-released internationally as part of the collection Playing the Piano, which introduced these piano versions to Western audiences.

== Reception ==
Mark Deming of AllMusic stated: "Internationally acclaimed musician and composer Ryuichi Sakamoto revisits some of his music of the past in a new and intimate setting on this album. 05 features Sakamoto's new interpretations of some of his noted film and television scores, this time arranged for solo piano. 05 includes Sakamoto's elegant new performances of music from the motion pictures The Last Emperor and The Sheltering Sky, as well as pieces from his solo albums and a smattering of new material."

== Track listing ==
All tracks are written by Ryuichi Sakamoto.

No.	Title	Length
1.	"Tibetan Dance"	4:22
2.	"A Flower Is Not a Flower"	6:35
3.	"Amore"	5:09
4.	"Energy Flow"	4:04
5.	"Aqua"	5:29
6.	"The Last Emperor"	6:42
7.	"Happyend"	5:02
8.	"Thousand Knives"	6:09
9.	"Fountain"	2:22
10.	"The Sheltering Sky"	4:54
11.	"Lost Theme"	4:37
12.	"Shining Boy & Little Randy"	4:56
13.	"Reversing"	3:33
14.	"Rainforest"	2:01
Total length:		66:00

== Personnel ==
- Ryuichi Sakamoto – piano, producing

== Charts ==
Chart (2009)	Peak position
Japanese Albums (Oricon)	28
