= Summer Nerves =

Studio album by Ryuichi Sakamoto
- Released: June 21, 1979
- Genres: Reggae; city pop; contemporary classical; jazz fusion; synth-pop
- Label: Sony Music Entertainment Japan
- Producer: Ryuichi Sakamoto

Ryuichi Sakamoto chronology
Thousand Knives (1978)	Summer Nerves (1979)	B-2 Unit (1980)

Summer Nerves (サマー・ナーヴス, Samā Nāvusu) is a collaborative studio album by Japanese musician Ryuichi Sakamoto. Released in 1979, it recorded a so-called "Martial arts (格闘技, kakutougi) session" between jazz fusion musicians and J-rock musicians, and was led by Sakamoto at the time of the formation of Yellow Magic Orchestra. "Martial arts (格闘技, kakutougi) session" of this album is regarded as a prototype of Kazumi Watanabe's "Kylyn session".

== Background ==
Although CBS Sony proposed an original plan of one bossa nova album, Sakamoto didn't accept it and conversely proposed a reggae album, and Summer Nerves was created as the achievement.

== Track listing ==
All tracks are written by Ryuichi Sakamoto (except where noted).

No.	Title	Length
1.	"Summer Nerves" (Akiko Yano)	4:10
2.	"You're Friend To Me" (Bernard Edwards & Nile Rodgers)	5:02
3.	"Sleep On My Baby" (Akiko Yano)	5:10
4.	"Theme For "Kakutougi"" (Yukihiro Takahashi & Aki Ikuta)	6:17
5.	"Gonna Go To I Colony"	4:40
6.	"Time Trip" (Kazumi Yasui)	4:15
7.	"Sweet Illusion"	6:30
8.	"Neuronian Network" (Haruomi Hosono)	4:03

== Personnel ==
- Producer, Arranged By – Ryuichi Sakamoto
- Keyboards – Ryuichi Sakamoto
- Backing Vocals – Eve (track: 2), Akiko Yano (track: 3), Tatsuro Yamashita (tracks: 5 and 7), Minako Yoshida (track: 7)
- Saxophone – Mabumi Yamaguchi (tracks: 1)
- Guitar – Kazumi Watanabe as Abdullah The "Busher" (tracks: 3, 7), Kenji Omura (tracks: 3, 7), Masaki Matsubara (tracks: 4, 5), Shigeru Suzuki (tracks: 1, 2, 4, 6)
- Bass – Ray Ohara (tracks: 1 to 4, 6, 7)
- Drums – Yukihiro Takahashi
- Percussion – Motoya Hamaguchi (tracks: 1, 2, 4, 6), Pecker (tracks: 3, 5, 7)
- Engineer – Yuichi Maejima*
- Associate Engineer – Mikio Takamatsu
- Recording Co-ordinator – Akira Ikuta
- Mastered By – Eiji Taniguchi
- Director – Shinichi Hashimoto
- Design – Mitsuru Yamada
- Illustration – Shigenari Ohnishi
- Photography By – Youhei Nagasaka
