= 12 (Ryuichi Sakamoto album) =

Studio album by Ryuichi Sakamoto
- Released: January 17, 2023
- Genres: Electronic; minimal
- Length: 60:01
- Labels: Milan; commmons
- Producer: Ryuichi Sakamoto

Ryuichi Sakamoto chronology
To the Moon and Back (2022)	12 (2023)	12 Conversations (2026)

12 is the fifteenth and final solo studio album (twentieth studio album overall) by Ryuichi Sakamoto. It was released on January 17, 2023, two months before his death from cancer, through Milan Records and commmons.

== Composition ==
12 has been noted to be an "unhurried" minimalist electronic album that features the "sound of him breathing as though engaged in strenuous activity" overlaid on "sparse piano pieces within electronic soundscapes imbued with a sobering weight."

== Critical reception ==
Professional ratings
Aggregate scores
Source	Rating
AnyDecentMusic?	7.9/10
Metacritic	85/100
Review scores
Source	Rating
AllMusic	3.5/5 stars
Clash	9/10
Financial Times	4/5 stars
Loud and Quiet	6/10
Pitchfork	7.6/10
The Skinny	5/5 stars
Slant	4/5 stars
Spectrum Culture	75%
Tom Hull	B
Uncut	9/10

At Metacritic, which assigns a weighted rating out of 100 to reviews from mainstream critics, the album has an average score of 85 based on nine reviews, indicating "universal acclaim".

Reviewing the album for AllMusic, Paul Simpson compared it to Sakamoto's previous work. Simpson claimed that, "While [async] was an inventive, ambitious work incorporating field recordings, spoken word vocals, and several guest musicians, 12 is considerably more stripped-down, created entirely by Sakamoto, mostly playing piano and synthesizers." Simpson concluded by stating that, "being aware that it was his final work adds emotional weight to music that appears fragile and delicate." In a review for The Skinny, Tony Inglis awarded 12 a 5-star rating and noted that unlike Sakamoto's previous works, 12 is a "collection [that] instead deals in the turbulent and unpredictable period that comes before the unknown." In a positive review for Pitchfork, Rob Arcand highlighted how "Rarely does an album this understated say so much."

== Track listing ==
All tracks are written by Ryuichi Sakamoto.

12 track listing
No.	Title	Length
1.	"20210310"	6:53
2.	"20211130"	5:22
3.	"20211201"	5:32
4.	"20220123"	8:40
5.	"20220202"	6:22
6.	"20220207"	7:01
7.	"20220214"	9:09
8.	"20220302 – Sarabande"	3:10
9.	"20220302"	2:52
10.	"20220307"	2:31
11.	"20220404"	2:26
12.	"20220304"	1:08
Total length:		60:01

== Personnel ==
- Ryuichi Sakamoto – performance, production, mixing
- Zak – mixing
- Robin Schmidt – mastering
- Norika Sora – associate production
- Alec Fellman – associate engineering, production management
- Maria Takeuchi – production management assistance
- Makoto Kondo – engineering assistance
- Takuya Minami – artwork

== Charts ==
=== Weekly charts ===
Weekly chart performance for 12
Chart (2023)	Peak position
Belgian Albums (Ultratop Flanders)	82
Belgian Albums (Ultratop Wallonia)	71
French Albums (SNEP)	54
German Albums (Offizielle Top 100)	21
Italian Albums (FIMI)	70
Japanese Albums (Oricon)	2
Japanese Combined Albums (Oricon)	4
Japanese Hot Albums (Billboard Japan)	3
Portuguese Albums (AFP)	2
Scottish Albums (Official Charts)	40
Spanish Albums (Promusicae)	74
Swiss Albums (Schweizer Hitparade)	41
UK Albums Sales (OCC)	31
UK Album Downloads (Official Charts)	58
US Top Album Sales (Billboard)	38
US Top Classical Albums (Billboard)	1

=== Monthly charts ===
Monthly chart performance for 12
Chart (2023)	Peak position
Japanese Albums (Oricon)	21
