= Loophole (album) =

Studio album by Sketch Show
- Released: November 27, 2003
- Genres: Electronica, Glitch Pop
- Length: 54:41
- Labels: avex, cutting edge, daisyworld discs
- Producer: Sketch Show

Sketch Show chronology
Wild Sketch Show (2003)	Loophole (2003)	Sketches & Notations (2004)

Loophole is the second album by Sketch Show.

== Track listing ==
All music is composed by Haruomi Hosono and Yukihiro Takahashi, except "Mars" and "Attention Tokyo", by Hosono, Ryuichi Sakamoto and Takahashi.

No.	Title	Lyrics	Length
1.	"Mars"	Hosono, Takahashi	4:15
2.	"Wiper"	Hosono, Takahashi	4:32
3.	"Chronograph"	Hosono, Takahashi	5:06
4.	"Plankton"		4:08
5.	"Flakes"	Takahashi, Meg	5:16
6.	"Attention Tokyo"	Hosono, Takahashi	3:22
7.	"Night Talker" (Safety Scissors Mix)	Takahashi	4:32
8.	"Traum 6.6"	Takahashi, Meg	5:26
9.	"Scotoma"		3:10
10.	"Fly Me to the River"	Hosono, Takahashi	4:36
11.	"Ekot" (Cornelius Mix)	Hosono, Takahashi	6:06
12.	"Stella"	Hosono, Meg	4:09

== Personnel ==
- Haruomi Hosono & Yukihiro Takahashi - Arranging, Mixing, Production
- Ryuichi Sakamoto - Mixing, Production ("Mars", "Attention Tokyo")
- Chiho Shibaoka - Swedish Voice ("Mars", "Wiper", "Chronograph" "Attention Tokyo", "Ekot")
- Hiroshi Haraguchi - Mixing, Recording Engineer
- Yasuo Kimoto - Mixing ("Plankton", "Fly Me to the River")
- Safety Scissors - Mixing ("Night Talker")
- Cornelius - Mixing ("Ekot")
- Tomohiko Gondo - Euphonium ("Ekot")
- Meg - Lyrics ("Flakes", "Traum 6.6", "Stella")
- Tom Coyne - Mastering
- Takashi Okada (Zubai Studio) - Art Direction, Design
- Daisy Creatures - Photography
