= The Sheltering Sky (soundtrack) =

Soundtrack album by Ryuichi Sakamoto
- Released: 1990
- Studios: Abbey Road Studios and Metropolis Studios; (London)
- Genres: Film score, spoken word
- Length: 55:08
- Label: Virgin Records
- Producer: Ryuichi Sakamoto

Ryuichi Sakamoto chronology
Beauty (1989)	The Sheltering Sky (1990)	Heartbeat (1991)

Professional ratings
Review scores
Source	Rating
AllMusic	4/5 stars

The Sheltering Sky is the original soundtrack to the 1990 film The Sheltering Sky (based on a novel by Paul Bowles) starring Debra Winger and John Malkovich. The original score was composed primarily by Ryuichi Sakamoto.

The album won the Golden Globe Award for Best Original Score and the LAFCA Award for Best Music.

== Track listing ==
No.	Title	Artist(s)	Length
1.	"The Sacred Koran"	Ibrahim Canakkeleli, Fevsi Misir, Yusuf Gebzeli, Aziz Bahriyeli	0:40
2.	"The Sheltering Sky Theme"	Ryuichi Sakamoto	5:19
3.	"Belly"	Ryuichi Sakamoto	1:27
4.	"Port's Composition"	Ryuichi Sakamoto	1:23
5.	"On The Bed (Dream)"	Ryuichi Sakamoto	1:37
6.	"Loneliness"	Ryuichi Sakamoto	1:30
7.	"On The Hill"	Ryuichi Sakamoto	6:10
8.	"Kyoto"	Ryuichi Sakamoto	1:04
9.	"Cemetery"	Ryuichi Sakamoto	1:25
10.	"Dying"	Ryuichi Sakamoto	3:30
11.	"Market"	Ryuichi Sakamoto	1:42
12.	"Grand Hotel"	Ryuichi Sakamoto	2:06
13.	"The Sheltering Sky Theme (Piano Version)"	Ryuichi Sakamoto	4:16
14.	"Je Chante"	Charles Trenet	2:44
15.	"Midnight Sun"	Lionel Hampton, Sonny Burke, Johnny Mercer	3:14
16.	"Fever Ride"	Richard Horowitz Avec Nizar Ismael	3:50
17.	"Chant Avec Cithare"	Burundi traditional	0:44
18.	"Marnia's Tent"	Richard Horowitz	3:02
19.	"Goulov Limma"	Cheba Zahouania	5:47
20.	"Happy Bus Ride" (Features Tunisian song "Nari ala Zarzis")	Naama	1:41
21.	"Night Train" (Features Moroccan woman's voices recorded in 1955 by Paul Bowles)	Richard Horowitz	1:57

=== LP edition ===
The vinyl edition has two additional tracks which were not included in the CD release:

1. Side B: 1. "Louange Au Prophete" (performed by Houria Aichi, flute played by Said Missia)
2. Side B: 10. "Guedra" (performed by The Awash of Ouarzazate, composed by Lanchen Zinoun)

== Personnel ==
- Ryuichi Sakamoto – composer, producer
- David Arch – conductor, arranger
- John Altman – conductor, arranger
- Royal Philharmonic Orchestra – orchestra
- James Cullum – keyboards, programmer, engineer
- Matt Howe – engineer
- Chris Ludwinski – engineer
- Spencer May – engineer
- Ray Staff – mastering
