= Thousand Knives =

Studio album by Ryuichi Sakamoto
- Released: October 25, 1978
- Recorded: April 10 – July 27, 1978
- Studios: Columbia Studios 1, 2 and 4, Tokyo, Japan
- Genres: Experimental; exotica; contemporary classical; progressive electronic; synth-pop
- Length: 45:37
- Label: Nippon Columbia
- Producer: Ryuichi Sakamoto

Ryuichi Sakamoto chronology
Thousand Knives (1978)	Summer Nerves (1979)

Professional ratings
Review scores
Source	Rating
AllMusic	3/5 stars
Pitchfork	8.2/10

Thousand Knives (also known as Thousand Knives of Ryuichi Sakamoto) is the debut solo album by Japanese musician Ryuichi Sakamoto. Released in 1978, it is a mostly electronic music album, foreshadowing his work with Yellow Magic Orchestra later that year.

== Overview ==
The album is named after Henri Michaux's description of the feeling of using mescaline in Miserable Miracle.

The title track begins with a vocoded Sakamoto reading "Jinggang Mountain", a poem written by Mao Zedong during his visit to a well in the Jinggang Mountains in 1965. The song proper is performed in a reggae hymn style, inspired by Herbie Hancock's Speak Like a Child album. The piece segues into "Island of Woods", a ten-minute analog synthesizer composition designed to sound like the natural sounds of an island. The modern classical piano piece "Grasshoppers" follows. On original copies of the album, the entire first side was indexed as one 24:40 long track.

The second side of the album contains varied electronic music pieces. "The End of Asia" uses the same melody as Haruomi Hosono's "Worry Beads" from Paraiso (though Sakamoto has claimed that the use was entirely coincidental) and the coda uses the melody of "The East Is Red", the national anthem of the People's Republic of China during the Cultural Revolution. Thus, the album as a whole summarizes Sakamoto's then-interest in Chinese history.

== Legacy ==
"Thousand Knives" is a staple of Sakamoto's repertoire, being rearranged for his synth-pop band Yellow Magic Orchestra in 1980 for their BGM album; as a classical trio for 8/21/1996; and for a piano duet on /05. Numerous other arrangements have been performed live over the years, both by YMO and by Sakamoto himself; these performances contain one of the earliest uses of the Roland TR-808 drum machine. "Plastic Bamboo" was also a staple of early YMO shows, though the only recording appears on their live album Live at Kinokuniya Hall 1978 released in 1994, sixteen years after being recorded. "The End of Asia" would also regularly appear during YMO shows, with a drastically different studio version included on their X∞Multiplies album.

The melodic lines in "Grasshoppers" and "The End of Asia" have been noted for their similarities to modern grime music. According to Logan Takahashi writing for Vice, the "bounciness and cartoonish sound quality" of the lead melodic line in "Grasshoppers" has a "strong grime feel" and he considers the melodic line a minute into "The End of Asia" as "the bedrock for sino-grime." This was a precursor to Sakamoto's 1982 song "Bamboo Houses" (with David Sylvian), which has been described as the "earliest example of proto-grime" by Fact magazine.

== Track listing ==
All tracks are written by Ryuichi Sakamoto.

Side one
No.	Title	Length
1.	"Thousand Knives" (千のナイフ Sen no Naifu)	9:34
2.	"Island of Woods"	9:50
3.	"Grasshoppers"	5:16

Side two
No.	Title	Length
4.	"Das Neue Japanische Elektronische Volkslied" (新日本電子的民謡 Shin Nihon Denshiteki Min'yō, "The New Japanese Electronic Folk Song")	8:05
5.	"Plastic Bamboo"	6:31
6.	"The End of Asia"	6:21

== Personnel ==
- Ryuichi Sakamoto – synthesizer (Moog III-C with Roland MC-8 Microcomposer, Polymoog, Minimoog, Micromoog, Oberheim Eight Voice Polyphonic with Digital Programmer, ARP Odyssey, KORG PS-3100 Polyphonic), vocoder (Korg VC-10), analog sequencer (KORG SQ-10), Syn-Drums, piano (on "Grasshoppers"), marimba, orchestration, production, liner notes
- Hideki Matsutake – computer operation, synthesizer programming assistance
- Harry Hosono – zill on "Thousand Knives", liner notes
- Motoya Hamaguchi – Syn-Drum solo on "Thousand Knives", Brazilian bird whistles on "Island of Woods"
- Kazumi Watanabe – Alembic guitar solo on "Thousand Knives" and "The End of Asia", rhythm on "The End of Asia"
- Yūji Takahashi – piano on "Grasshoppers"
- Tatsuro Yamashita – castanets on "Das Neue Japanische Elektronische Volkslied"
- Pecker – Syn-Drum solo on "Plastic Bamboo"
- Akira Ikuta – management
- Hikaru Hayashi – liner notes
- Yukihiro Takahashi – fashion coordination (jacket by Giorgio Armani; shirt, tie and belt by Bricks; Levi's 501 Jeans; shoes – "Zapata" by Manolo Blahnik)
- Makoto Iida – cover photo
- Satoshi "Sign" Saitoh – cover design
- Mr. Kawaguchi, Mr. Ueno & the staff of "KORG" – special thanks (for their great cooperation)

== See also ==
- 1978 in Japanese music
