= Beauty (Ryuichi Sakamoto album) =

Studio album by Ryuichi Sakamoto
- Released: November 21, 1989
- Studios: Take One Studio, Zero Studio, Onkio Haus, Sound Inn Studio; (Tokyo); Platinum Island Recording Studio, Right Track, Bear Tracks, The Power Station; (New York City); Complex; (Los Angeles)
- Genres: Synth-pop, experimental rock
- Length: 59:02 (Japanese release)
- Label: Virgin
- Producer: Ryuichi Sakamoto

Ryuichi Sakamoto chronology
The Last Emperor (1987)	Beauty (1989)	The Sheltering Sky (1990)

Professional ratings
Review scores
Source	Rating
AllMusic	4.5/5 stars
Robert Christgau	(neither)
Entertainment Weekly	B

Beauty is the eighth solo studio album by Japanese musician Ryuichi Sakamoto. Both a Japanese and an international version were released by Virgin Records in 1989 and 1990, respectively. The international release contains the track "You Do Me (Edit)" featuring singer Jill Jones, a song previously released as a single.

== Overview ==
Beauty is notable for its "collage of styles" that range from rock, techno, and classical to flamenco, African, and Japanese traditional. In discussing whether music is narrative and illustrative or an abstract medium, Sakamoto said, "I have visions sometimes when I'm writing contemporary music, even when it's very logical. For example, for one of my songs on the album Beauty, I was always having visions of Amazonian rainforests, a little plane flying very low over the trees. Trees, trees, trees, and some birds. But the title of the song is 'Calling from Tokyo'."

Recorded at various sound studios throughout Tokyo, New York, and Los Angeles, Beauty features many collaborators that include Arto Lindsay, Brian Wilson, Robbie Robertson, Sly Dunbar and Youssou N'Dour. On his time working with Wilson, Sakamoto said, "I had asked Brian Wilson to sing on the album so I went to Los Angeles and we recorded with him. I had been informed that he had had a difficult time, some kind of mental illness, and I could sense that, even though he wasn't that surprising in the studio. But then the following day, I flew from LA back to New York to continue recording and he showed up without telling me, with his whole family in tow. The schedule was already tightly planned, but I was so grateful he'd come, so we made some time to work with him. It was a beautiful moment – one I won't forget for the rest of my life."

== Track listing ==
Japanese version
No.	Title	Length
1.	"Calling from Tokyo"	4:26
2.	"Rose"	5:12
3.	"安里屋ユンタ" (Asadoya Yunta, "Yunta village")	4:35
4.	"Futique"	4:09
5.	"Amore"	4:55
6.	"We Love You"	5:16
7.	"Diabaram"	4:13
8.	"A Pile of Time"	5:34
9.	"Romance"	5:29
10.	"ちんさぐの花" (Chinsagu no hana, "Flowers of Chinsagu")	7:26
11.	"Adagio" (CD only track)	7:47
Total length:		59:04

International version
No.	Title	Length
1.	"You Do Me (Edited Version)"	5:02
2.	"Calling from Tokyo"	4:25
3.	"A Rose"	5:02
4.	"安里屋ユンタ" (Asadoya Yunta, "Yunta village")	4:31
5.	"Futique"	4:03
6.	"Amore"	4:50
7.	"We Love You (Remix)"	5:02
8.	"Diabaram"	4:12
9.	"A Pile of Time"	5:28
10.	"Romance"	5:24
11.	"ちんさぐの花" (Chinsagu no hana, "Flowers of Chinsagu")	7:26
12.	"You Do Me (7" mix)" (hidden track)	4:00
Total length:		59:51

== Personnel ==
Performers

- Ryuichi Sakamoto – composer, producer, mixing, engineering, arranger, keyboards, piano, vocals
- Arto Lindsay – vocals, rap
- Brian Wilson – vocals
- Kazumi Tamaki – vocals, shamisen
- Misako Koja – vocals, shamisen
- Nicky Holland – vocals
- Yoriko Ganeko – vocals, shamisen, castanets
- Youssou N'Dour – vocals
- Laura Shaheen – vocals
- Robert Wyatt – vocals
- Jill Jones – vocals ("You Do Me")
- Alex Brown – backing vocals ("You Do Me")
- Angel Rogers – backing vocals ("You Do Me")
- Anita Sherman – backing vocals ("You Do Me")
- Kirk Crumpler – keyboards, programmer ("You Do Me")
- Carlos Lomas – guitar
- Bun Itakura – guitar
- Dali Kimoko-N’Dala – guitar
- Eddie Martinez – guitar, soloist
- Robbie Robertson – guitar
- Pino Palladino – bass
- Mark Johnson – bass
- Larry White – bass ("You Do Me")
- Sly Dunbar – drums
- Pandit Dinesh – tabla
- Naná Vasconcelos – percussion
- Paco Yé – percussion
- Seidou "Baba" Outtara – percussion
- Sibiri Outtara – percussion
- Magatie Fall – talking drum
- Milton Cardona – shekere
- L. Shankar – double violin
- Sang Won Park – zither
- Sham Guibbory – string section leader
- Jiang Jian Huo – erhu

Technical

- Greg Calbi – engineer, mastering
- Jason Corsaro – engineer, mixing
- Ikuo Honma – engineer
- Kinji Yoshino – engineer
- Mark Lynette – engineer
- Naoto Shibuya – engineer
- Roger Moutenot – engineer
- Yutaka Arai – engineer
- Carmen Rizzo – engineer, mixer, programmer ("You Do Me")
- Dan Gellert – assistant engineer
- Douglas Rose – assistant engineer
- Gary Solomon – assistant engineer
- John Herman – assistant engineer
- Junichi Yamazaki – assistant engineer
- Michael White – assistant engineer
- Seiichi Yoritomi – assistant engineer
- Tetsuya Ishizuka – assistant engineer
- Yuuki Mizutani – assistant engineer
- Darin Prindle – assistant engineer ("You Do Me")
- Kevin Casey – assistant engineer ("You Do Me")
- Sylvia Massy – assistant engineer ("You Do Me")
- Masaya Nishida – programming
- Jeff Bova – programming (drum sound, keyboards)
- Bill Seery – programming (drums)
- Yuji Suguyama – programming, computer operation
- Shingo Take – sampling

== Charts ==
Chart (1989)	Peak position
Japanese Albums (Oricon)	14
Dutch Albums (Album Top 100)	84
