= Seven Samurai 20XX =

2004 video game

- Developers: Dimps; Polygon Magic
- Publisher: Sammy
- Artist: Mœbius
- Composer: Ryuichi Sakamoto (Note: Opening and ending music)
- Platform: PlayStation 2
- Release: JP: January 8, 2004; NA: March 12, 2004; EU: April 30, 2004
- Genres: Hack and slash, Action-adventure
- Mode: Single-player

Seven Samurai 20XX (20XX 七人の侍, 20XX: Shichinin no Samurai) is a PlayStation 2 game released by Sammy Studios in 2004. Its story and concept are based upon Akira Kurosawa's 1954 movie Seven Samurai. Rights for the production of the game were given by the Kurosawa production, with character designs by French artist Mœbius and the composition of the opening and ending music by Ryuichi Sakamoto.

Seven Samurai 20XX is a re-telling of Seven Samurai in a futuristic setting. It takes various liberties with the original story to better suit the post setting and introduces anime and modern styled designs. The game follows seven samurai as they fight off an immense army of mutants, cyborgs and other inhuman creatures in an attempt to bring about a regime of peace for those in need. The player takes the role of Natoe, a samurai, and is sent through various locations of post-Japan to fight off hundreds of enemies with a twin-sworded fighting style known as Nitou-Ryu.

The year is 20XX and the setting is Japan. Humans and Humanoids, the latter being various mutants, cyborgs, and robots, maintain a delicate balance in a large, unnamed city (somewhat resembling a post-apocalyptic Tokyo) where the power and balance of the city is maintained by a large structure known as the Steeple of light. Its source of power is a young girl named the Child of Heaven. When the child is stolen by the humanoids in order to break the balance and initiate war, the child then goes missing from her inhuman captors and is held by several villagers to ransom the city for money. When the humanoids and various Agents of the city set out to retrieve her and her Sacred Jewel, the villagers quickly find themselves in danger and look for Samurai (known in the game as "hunters") to protect them.

== Gameplay ==
Seven Samurai 20XX is a hack and slash video game, as the protagonist of the game is faced with the task of destroying overwhelming hordes of enemies with his swords. Like many others of its genre, it utilizes a combo system, showing the player how many uninterrupted hits they have inflicted upon their opponents.

The main point of the game is to constantly utilize the second sword which is carried in the protagonist's sheath, allowing the player to achieve a larger combo score. Skill-related battle commands such as the Nitou-Ryu mode allow the player to wield a second katana for a limited time, or increase the speed, range and power of the player's combos.

=== Battle maneuvers ===
Natoe uses Nitou-Ryu mode (twin swords) on a gang of thugs, currently at a 6-hit combo multiper.

Nitou-Ryu mode is a duration of time engaged when the player presses the L1 and R1 triggers on the PlayStation 2 controller. It permits the protagonist to use a second blade for a limited amount of time to increase attack power and range of the weapons. As the player progresses in the game, the length of the bar can be increased.

A Just Guard allows the player to deflect an enemy's attack with skillfully timed uses of the triangle button. It allows the player to avoid damage and generates a counter-attack opportunity. This move also fully refills the Nitou-Ryu timer to 100% of its capacity.

A Just Step is executed with proper timing of the X button and allows the player to avoid an enemy's attack and "step" (in-game, it looks more akin to a teleport) behind the enemy for a counter-attack. This move partially refills the Nitou-Ryu timer. A Just Attack allows Natoe to travel in the direction of one or more enemies at great speed, breaking their defense. This move also partially refills the Nitou-Ryu meter. The game also incorporates various Street Fighter-like combos and "Charge attacks" which occur when holding the square button at various combos and when dashing with the X button.

== Plot ==
While the story is based on the film Seven Samurai, its story and plot have more in common with its animated counterpart, Samurai 7. The storyline is divided into chapters:

Natoe encounters the powerful Zex in the Overture Chapter.

The game begins as a young samurai known as Natoe is passing through the town during the humanoid invasion of the city. As he passes through the ruined city, he encounters several humanoid foot soldiers, defeating them. He then encounters the Humanoid known as Zex. After seriously wounding him, he meets the fleeing villagers who inquire if he can help protect their village from future humanoid attacks. Natoe declines, and leaves the villagers, fighting more humanoids along the way.

After encountering his childhood friend Jodie, Natoe works his way through the city, finishing off the remaining humanoids from the prior invasion. He eventually meets up with Kanbei, who convinces him to help out the villagers or they will be overrun by the next invasion of Humanoids. Natoe reluctantly agrees.

However, Kanbei realizes that they need more samurai to defend the village. They venture out into various areas to recruit 5 more skilled warriors. Natoe eventually finds the thief Totsuma in the city's Scrapyard area. Natoe defeats Necryl, earning Totsuma's trust and place on the team. Kanbei now tells the team of his former war ally Rojie, and the team set out to the main part of the city to locate him.

Natoe and the others arrive in the heart of the bustling city to find the whereabouts of Rojie. Discovering his occupation as a bodyguard for a female mob leader named Salla, Natoe goes off to find him, defeating leagues of street thugs and the drug dealer Kyric in the process. He meets the friendly warrior Eight before leaving the district.

Rojie now on the team, Natoe recalls the man Eight and suggests to the others that he be enlisted to join the team. Noticing Eight descend into the City's underground sewers, Natoe follows. Much to his surprise, he encounters the humanoid White Fox and battles him on several occasions. At the end of the sewers, he meets the mysterious "Man in White" and discovers Jodie and Eight are both agents of the city. Saving Eight from the Man in White, Natoe convinces him to join the team.

The Samurai arrive at the village.

Leaving the city, the encourage of Natoe, Eight and Rojie make their way to the village to rendezvous with the rest of the team. Along the way Natoe encounters a team of agents from the city, as well as the enigmatic Zwei.

Reaching the village, Kanbei and the samurai become suspicious of the villagers withdrawn behavior. Natoe decides to investigate, finding out in the process Hinata's true origins and the villagers deceitful motives. Afterwards, the team come to the conclusion that Humanoids attack on the village will be occurring soon. Natoe leaves the village in an attempt to find one last samurai to help in the ensuing battle.

Natoe arrives in the wilderness to find an angry Zex and the humanoid Fen waiting for him. Zex's massive strength causes the ground to collapse, and Natoe finds himself in an underground city called the "Town of Warriors". Here he encounters Ein, a humanoid able to defeat his opponents using magic. He saves the female humanoid Cue in the process, offering to help her find her lost memories in return for her assistance. Afterwards he finds Jodie who apologies for having deceived Natoe, she then tells him to find "the traitor" and runs off. Shortly after he is reunited with Eight who, being the traitor of the city, has had his eyes cut out. Eight returns to the village with Natoe, confident he can still fight to protect the child.

Deciding to take the offensive, the team of Natoe, Cue and Totsuma leave the village to infiltrate the humanoid Drei's Fort, where he has been constructing new humanoid experiments using captured test subjects. Natoe also discovers the immense newly upgraded "Zex Beast" creature and destroys it. However, Totsuma is caught in a trap and killed when the fortress collapses.

Returning to the village, the samurai proceed to go on the defensive and protect the city from the massive Humanoid attack. During this attack, Eight sacrifices himself by blowing up one of the entrances to the village. After the ensuing battle of thousands, Natoe works his way to a fight with Zwei, defeating her and her three warriors before she retreats.

The village safe for the time being, however, the "Man In White" informs them that the city no longer need the sacred child and that Jodie has been kidnapped by the humanoids. Natoe and Cue team up to face the last of Humanoids at a facility called the "Library of Avalon". As they walk through the Library, they encounter several horrific creatures called "Guardians", along with Cue beginning to regain her lost memories. She is eventually kidnapped by Ein however, and Natoe fights through several Humanoids, including the "Ultimate Zex" incarnation and the immortal Fen. After defeating them, Natoe finally confronts the powerful and mysterious being known as Ein, who battles Natoe in his original humanoid form, then absorbs Cue to become the powerful god-like being called Almana. Finding its only weak spot to be its angelic like wings, Natoe destroys them, then is able to attack its vulnerable body.

Now having rescued Jodie, Natoe returns to village, but is confronted by the humanoid Zwei, in her last attempt to gain the power of the sacred jewel and the child. Natoe tries to fight Zwei but on a bridge and Jodie is knocked over the edge. Natoe grabs her in an attempt to pull her up but he is stabbed in back by Zwei. He succeeds in stabbing and killing Zwei, but the bridge collapses and he and Jodie fall to their death, leaving only two samurai left. After the aftermath, Kanbei quotes the original movie pertaining to their situation: "So again we are defeated. The farmers have won. Not us."

=== Steeple of Light ===
The interior of the Steeple of Light

The Steeple of Light is a tower located in the middle of the city in the game's setting. It houses various clones of the Sacred child along with the current girl herself who prays with the sacred jewel, and provides power to the surrounding city and areas. When the child and jewel are kidnapped, the tower loses its power source and sends the balance of species in to a war over her power.

== Reception ==
Reception

Aggregate score
| Aggregator | Score |
|---|---|
| Metacritic | 52/100 |

Review scores
| Publication | Score |
|---|---|
| Edge | 2/10 |
| Electronic Gaming Monthly | 3.67/10 |
| Famitsu | 25/40 |
| Game Informer | 5/10 |
| GamePro | 2.5/5 |
| GameRevolution | D+ |
| GameSpot | 6.3/10 |
| GameSpy | 2/5 |
| GameZone | 6.7/10 |
| IGN | 6.7/10 |
| Official U.S. PlayStation Magazine | 2/5 |
| Playboy | 63% |
| The Sydney Morning Herald | 1/5 |

Seven Samurai 20XX received "mixed" reviews according to video game review aggregator website Metacritic.

The game was criticized for its poor pacing, sub-par voice acting, and linear gameplay with a lack of sufficient depth. GameSpot complained that the combat system was too direct, only requiring the player to use the square button to defeat enemies and that the combo system was unnecessary for progression. Other websites such as GamePro complained about the game being average merely due to the lineage it had to live up to due to its predecessor, Seven Samurai, and did not live up to expectations for such a legendary film.
