= Audio Sponge =

Studio album by Sketch Show
- Released: September 19, 2002
- Genres: Electronica, Glitch Pop
- Labels: avex, cutting edge, daisyworld discs
- Producer: Sketch Show

Sketch Show chronology
Audio Sponge (2002)	Tronika (2003)

Audio Sponge is the debut album by the electronica duo Sketch Show.

== Track listing ==
All music is composed by Haruomi Hosono and Yukihiro Takahashi, except where noted.

No.	Title	Lyrics	Music	Length
1.	"Turn Turn"	Hosono, Takahashi		4:30
2.	"Wonderful to Me"	Hosono, Takahashi	Hosono, Ryuichi Sakamoto, Takahashi	5:36
3.	"Microtalk"			5:01
4.	"Wilson"	Takahashi		5:16
5.	"Supreme Secret"	Hosono, Takahashi	Hosono, Sakamoto, Takahashi	2:59
6.	"Do You Want to Marry Me"	Corrine Tulipe	Michel Magne	3:47
7.	"Gokigen Ikaga 1・2・3" (ごきげんいかがワン・ツゥ・スリー Gokigen Ikaga Wan Tsuu Surī)	Katsuya Kobayashi, Masato Ibu, Moichi Kuwahara	Hosono	4:12
8.	"Reform"			3:41
9.	"Flying George"	Takahashi		4:34
10.	"Turn Down Day"	Dave Blume, Jerry Keller	Blume, Keller	3:21
11.	"Return"	Hosono, Takahashi		3:50
12.	"Theme from A Summer Place"	Mack Discant	Max Steiner	3:19

== Notes ==
- Mastered at Sterling Sound, NYC.
- "Gokigen Ikaga 1・2・3" is similar to the Blondie song "Rapture". It was originally released on Snakeman Show's self-titled album (being broadcast during their radio show), titled Sakisaka to Momonai no Gokigen Ikaga One Two Three (咲坂と桃内のごきげんいかがワン・ツゥ・スリー), with the performer credited as You an' Me Orgasmus Orchestra (ユー・アンド・ミー・オルガスムス・オーケストラ, Yū ando Mī Orugasumusu Ōkesutora) (Snakeman Show on vocals, with Hosono on instruments).

== Personnel ==
- Haruomi Hosono & Yukihiro Takahashi - Arranging, Mixing, Production
- Ryuichi Sakamoto - Keyboards, Clavinet, Sampler
- Yasuo Kimoto - Mixing, Production
- Goh Hotoda, Yoshifumi Lio - Mixing
- Towa Tei, Tadashi Matsuda - Mixing, Post Production
- Tom Coyne - Mastering
- Yuka Honda - Mastering Coordination
- Hachiro Sugiyama - Art Direction, Photography
- Tom Yoda - Coordination
- Atsushi Matsui - Assistance
- Yuichi Ishikura - Artists and repertoire
- Shinji Hayashi, Masato Matsūra, Masakazu Satō, Haji Taniguchi - Executive Production
