= Sketch Show =

Japanese electronica duo

- Genres: Electronica
- Years active: 2002-2007
- Labels: Avex Group, cutting edge, daisyworld discs
- Members: Haruomi Hosono, Yukihiro Takahashi; Collaborators; Ryuichi Sakamoto, Cornelius

Sketch Show was a Japanese electronica duo formed in 2002 by two of the three former members of Yellow Magic Orchestra, Haruomi Hosono and Yukihiro Takahashi. In some live shows, Ryuichi Sakamoto joined in band performances, which eventually led to the three readopting the YMO name in the latter half of the decade.

"Similar to Yellow Magic Orchestra, Sketch Show's sound relies heavily on cutting-edge technology (synthesizers the first time, computers this time), but what sets the duo apart from thousands of other knob-twiddlers is the sense of songcraft and pop sensibility that they have consistently displayed over their careers. Both men sing and play traditional instruments [...]. While not genre-specific, Sketch Show's music is loosely categorized as electronica. The band released its debut album, Audio Sponge, in 2002, shortly after a well-received appearance at Takkyu Ishino's massive rave event, WIRE02. In addition to Hosono and Takahashi, the record featured collaborations with former YMO member Ryuichi Sakamoto and Towa Tei. Shows following the release of the record were instant sellouts.[...] In February 2003, the band released the mini-album Tronika, which featured remixes by Cornelius. Early that summer, they played a show-stealing slot at SONAR 2003 in Barcelona, and CYBERSONICA 03 in London. These shows were the first European appearances for Hosono and Takahashi in two decades. September 2003 saw the release of a live DVD, Wild Sketch Show Live 2002, featuring footage culled from a string of December 2002 performances at the legendary Shibuya-AX, and including a medley of YMO classics along with their new material. Toward the end of 2003, the band released their second album, LOOPHOLE. The album again featured collaborations with Sakamoto, and remixes by Cornelius and Safety Scissors."

In 2004, Sketch Show performed live shows with Sakamoto under the name "Human Audio Sponge", or "HAS". Since 2005, Sketch Show has wound down, and in 2007, Hosono, Sakamoto and Takahashi released the single "Rescue / Rydeen 79/07" under the name "HASYMO", which was made in the style of Sketch Show's music, with heavier incorporation of live instruments. Since 2008, the combination of Hosono, Sakamoto and Takahashi performed together as "Yellow Magic Orchestra", continuing with what was developed as Sketch Show/Human Audio Sponge/HASYMO. However, new recorded material was not forthcoming.

On January 11, 2023, Takahashi died at the age of 70, following a case of pneumonia. He had undergone surgery to remove a brain tumor in 2020 but continued to have health troubles that interfered with his musical activities in the intervening years.

== Discography ==
=== Albums ===
- Audio Sponge (2002)
- Loophole (2003)

=== EPs ===
- Tronika (2003)

=== Singles ===
- Ekot/Chronograph (2003)
- Loopholes (2005)

=== Video albums ===
- Wild Sketch Show (2003)

=== Remix albums ===
- Sketches & Notations (2004)

=== Appearances ===
- Space Invaders (2003)
- Babel (2006)
