= BTTB (album) =

Studio album by Ryuichi Sakamoto
- Released: February 2, 1999
- Studios: Tokyo Opera City Concert Hall, Mouri Artworks Studio and Victor Aoyama Studio; (Tokyo)
- Genre: Classical
- Length: 63:04
- Label: Sony Classical
- Producer: Ryuichi Sakamoto

Ryuichi Sakamoto chronology
Discord (1997)	BTTB (1999)	Comica (2002)

Singles from BTTB
- 1. "Ura BTTB (ウラBTTB)" Released: May 26, 1999

Alternative cover
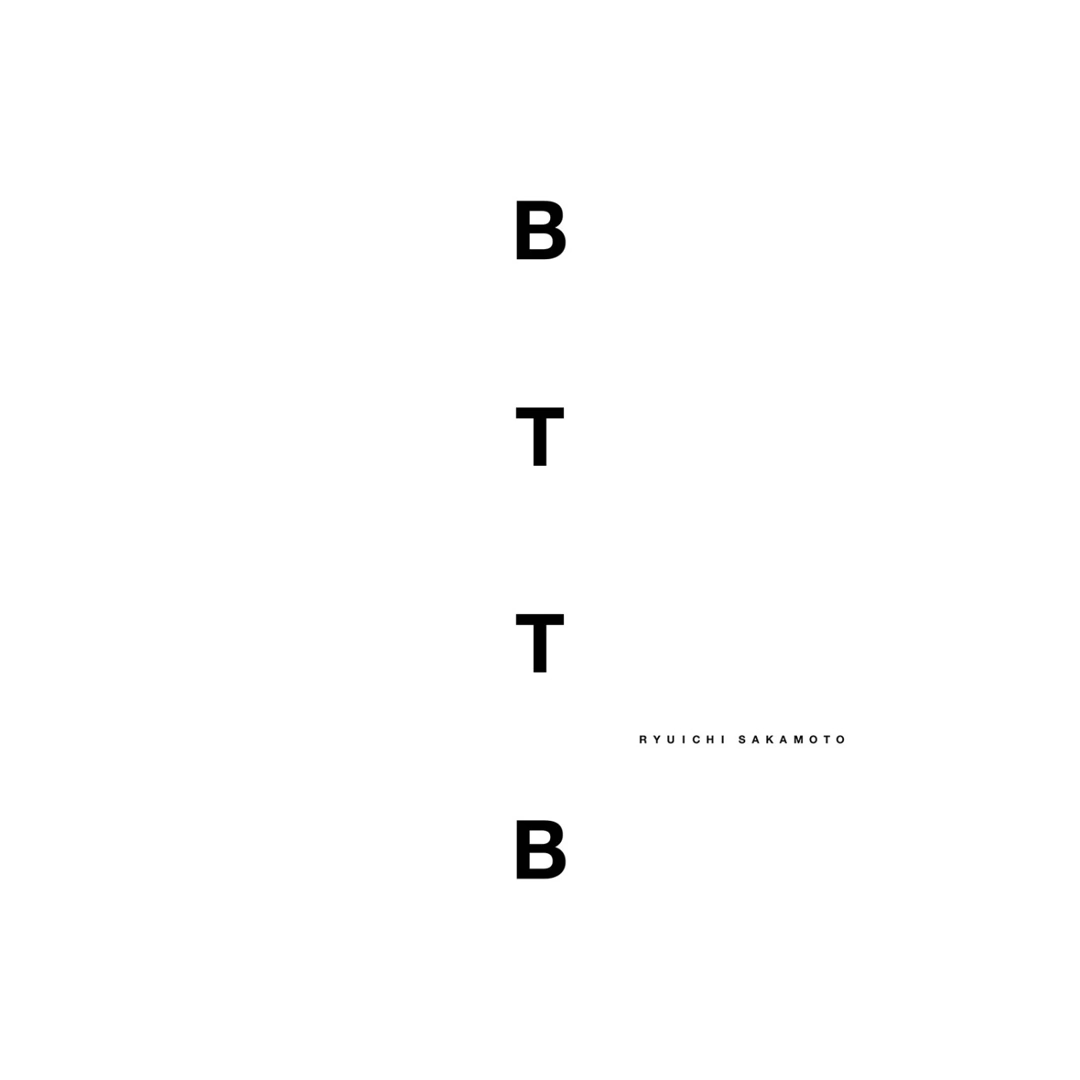
- 20th Anniversary Edition

Professional ratings
Review scores
Source	Rating
AllMusic	3/5 stars
Pitchfork	8.0/10

BTTB is a 1999 piano solo and duet album by Ryuichi Sakamoto. The album title is an acronym for "Back To The Basics". Two separate versions of the album were pressed, for Japanese and international markets. The International version opens with the three songs off of the "Ura BTTB" (ウラBTTB) maxi single released in Japan as a promotional tool, while replacing a few pieces elsewhere on the album. The maxi single peaked at no. 1 on the Japanese singles chart and was the fourth best selling single of 1999 in Japan.

== Track listing ==
All tracks are written by Ryuichi Sakamoto.

Japanese version
No.	Title	Length
1.	"Opus"	4:27
2.	"Sonatine"	3:38
3.	"Intermezzo"	3:44
4.	"Lorenz and Watson"	3:57
5.	"Choral No. 1"	2:27
6.	"Choral No. 2"	2:05
7.	"Do Bacteria Sleep?"	4:18
8.	"Bachata"	8:14
9.	"Chanson"	2:23
10.	"Distant Echo"	5:53
11.	"Prelude"	4:08
12.	"Sonata"	3:31
13.	"Uetax"	0:26
14.	"Aqua"	4:29
15.	"Snake Eyes"	6:07
16.	"Tong Poo"	5:03

International version
No.	Title	Length
1.	"Energy Flow"	4:36
2.	"Put Your Hands Up"	4:51
3.	"Railroad Man"	4:42
4.	"Opus"	4:27
5.	"Sonatine"	3:38
6.	"Intermezzo"	3:44
7.	"Lorenz and Watson"	3:57
8.	"Choral No. 1"	2:27
9.	"Choral No. 2"	2:05
10.	"Bachata"	8:14
11.	"Chanson"	2:23
12.	"Prelude"	4:08
13.	"Uetax"	0:26
14.	"Aqua"	4:29
15.	"Tong Poo"	5:03
16.	"Reversing"	3:58

== Personnel ==
- Ryuichi Sakamoto – piano, production
- Fernando Aponte – engineer
- Naoto Shibuya – engineer, mixing
- Masaki Sekiguchi – assistant engineer
- Ted Jensen – mastering
- Hideki Nakajima – direction
