= Merry Christmas Mr. Lawrence (instrumental) =

1983 instrumental by Ryuichi Sakamoto

Single by Ryuichi Sakamoto

from the album Merry Christmas Mr. Lawrence O.S.T
- B-side: "Sowing the Seed"
- Released: September 1983
- Genre: Electronic; neoclassical new-age
- Length: 4:38
- Label: Virgin
- Songwriter: Ryuichi Sakamoto
- Producer: Ryuichi Sakamoto

Ryuichi Sakamoto singles chronology
"Forbidden Colours" (1983)	"Merry Christmas Mr. Lawrence" (1983)	"Field Work" (1985)

"Merry Christmas Mr. Lawrence" is a 1983 instrumental by the Japanese composer Ryuichi Sakamoto, recorded for the 1983 film Merry Christmas, Mr. Lawrence. Sakamoto also recorded a vocal version, "Forbidden Colours", featuring the English singer David Sylvian. In 1999, a remix by Watergate, "Heart of Asia", was successful in the UK and Denmark. In 2024, the German band Kraftwerk covered "Merry Christmas Mr. Lawrence" in tribute to Sakamoto after his death in 2023.

== Reception ==
According to the Guardian film critic Peter Bradshaw, "Merry Christmas Mr. Lawrence" is one of the most famous film themes of the 1980s, with an "inspirationally catchy westernised pop take on Japanese music". It inspired the mandolin part of the 1991 R.E.M. song "Losing My Religion".

== Charts ==
Chart (1983)	Peak position
Australia (Kent Music Report)	88
New Zealand (Recorded Music NZ)	38
UK Singles (Official Charts)	93

Chart (2016)	Peak position
France (SNEP)	185

== Forbidden Colours ==
"Forbidden Colours"

Single by David Sylvian and Ryuichi Sakamoto

from the album Merry Christmas Mr. Lawrence
- B-side: "The Seed and the Sower" (by Sakamoto)
- Released: 24 June 1983
- Recorded: 1983
- Genre: Art pop; neoclassical new-age
- Length: 4:42
- Label: Virgin
- Songwriters: Ryuichi Sakamoto (music); David Sylvian (lyrics)
- Producer: Ryuichi Sakamoto

Ryuichi Sakamoto singles chronology
"Riot in Lagos" (1983)	"Forbidden Colours" (1983)	"Merry Christmas Mr. Lawrence" (1983)

David Sylvian singles chronology
"Bamboo Houses" (1982)	"Forbidden Colours" (1983)	"Red Guitar" (1984)

Sakamoto created a vocal version, "Forbidden Colours", with the English singer David Sylvian. It reached the top 20 of the UK singles chart in July and August 1983.

After Sylvian's band Japan broke up, he did not write music until Sakamoto invited him to work on "Forbidden Colours". Sakamoto originally expected Sylvian's vocal to follow the instrumental melody, but Sylvian found this impossible and instead wrote a counter-melody. Sylvain said of Sakamoto's theme: "Sonically it was incredible. I loved all the samples that he was using ... Sound design was a big part of it for us, and what Ryuichi as producer did was extraordinary with that particular piece of music."

Sylvian later recorded another version, which is featured as a bonus track for the CD version of Secrets of the Beehive. It also appears in Sylvian's 2012 compilation album A Victim of Stars 1982–2012.

=== Chart positions ===
Chart (1983)	Peak position
Australia (Kent Music Report)	29
Iceland (Dagblaðið Vísir)	1
Ireland (IRMA)	15
UK Singles (Official Charts)	16

== Heart of Asia ==
"Heart of Asia"

Single by Watergate
- B-side: "Infinity" (club mix)
- Released: 24 September 1999
- Length: 3:06 (radio edit)
- Label: Dance Division; Underdog
- Songwriter: Ryuichi Sakamoto
- Producers: Tommaso De Donatis; Orhan Terzi; David Haid

In September 1999, the German-Turkish DJ Watergate released a remix, "Heart of Asia". It reached the top ten of the singles charts in Denmark and the UK. The British journalist James Masterton wrote that it was "one of the few dance treatments of a famous song that actually manages to make the original seem almost dull by comparison".

=== Charts ===
==== Weekly charts ====
Chart (1999–2000)	Peak position
Australia (ARIA)	98
Denmark (IFPI)	4
Europe (Eurochart Hot 100)	18
Germany (GfK)	26
Ireland (IRMA)	13
Scottish Singles Sales (Official Charts)	2
Switzerland (Schweizer Hitparade)	22
UK Singles (Official Charts)	3
UK Dance (Official Charts)	1

==== Year-end charts ====
Chart (2000)	Position
Ireland (IRMA)	98
UK Singles (OCC)	86

=== Release history ===
Region	Date	Format(s)	Label(s)	Ref.
Germany	24 September 1999	CD	Dance Division; Underdog	
United Kingdom	1 May 2000	12-inch vinyl; CD; cassette	Positiva	

== Kraftwerk cover ==
On 27 July 2024, at the Fuji Rock Festival in Naeba, the German band Kraftwerk covered "Merry Christmas Mr. Lawrence" as a tribute to Sakamoto, who died in 2023. The Kraftwerk member Ralf Hütter had been friends with Sakamoto since 1981. After performing "Merry Christmas Mr. Lawrence", Kraftwerk played their single "Radioactivity", for which Sakamoto wrote additional Japanese lyrics in 2012.
