= The Mooney Suzuki discography =

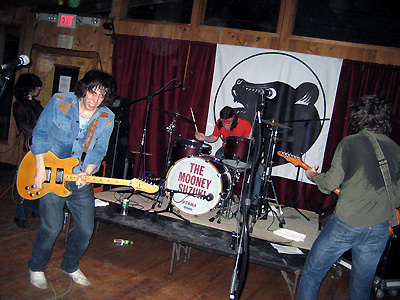
- Studio albums: 4
- Extended plays: 2
- Live albums: 1
- Singles: 11

The American garage rock band The Mooney Suzuki has released four studio albums, one live album, two extended plays (EPs) and eleven singles.

== Studio albums ==
Year	Album details
2000	People Get Ready: Released: September 5, 2000; Label: Estrus (ES 1273); Formats: CD, LP
2002	Electric Sweat: Released: April 2002; Label: Gammon (GR2101); Format: CD
2004	Alive & Amplified: Released: August 24, 2004; Label: Red Ink/Columbia (WK 76606); Formats: CD, LP
2007	Have Mercy: Released: June 19, 2007; Label: Elixia/Templar (#003); Formats: CD, LP

== Live albums ==
Year	Album details
2008	CBGB OMFUG Masters: Live June 29, 2001: The Bowery Collection: Released: March 18, 2008; Label: MVD (#4674); Format: CD

== Extended plays ==
Year	Album details
1999	The Mooney Suzuki: Label: Self-released (TMS001); Format: CD
2006	The Maximum Black EP: Released: September 12, 2006; Label: V2 (#27339); Format: CD

== Singles ==
Year	Song	Album
1998	"Taking Me Apart"	Non-album single
1998	"Love Is Everywhere"	Non-album single
1999	"Turn My Blue Sky Black"	The Mooney Suzuki
2000	"Your Love Is a Gentle Whip"	The Mooney Suzuki
2002	"Hot Shitter"	Non-album single
2002	"Oh Sweet Susanna"	Electric Sweat
2003	"Hey Joe"	Non-album single
2003	"In a Young Man's Mind"	Electric Sweat
2004	"Shake That Bush Again"	Alive & Amplified
2005	"Alive & Amplified"	Alive & Amplified
2007	"99%"	Have Mercy

== Notes ==
1. Electric Sweat was re-released by Columbia on May 12, 2003.
2. The Mooney Suzuki was also known as The Black EP.
3. The Maximum Black EP is a re-release of The Mooney Suzuki with additional tracks.
