= Jean-Philippe Rykiel =

French musician and composer (born 1961)

Jean-Philippe Rykiel (born 1961) is a French composer, arranger, and musician, primarily a keyboard player. He has been blind since his birth, a result of negligence in the hospital incubator, and is the son of fashion designer Sonia Rykiel.

== Discography ==
=== Solo ===
- 1982 Jean-Philippe Rykiel - (Musiza/Ariola)
- 1991 Nunc Music (Quiet Days In Tokyo) - Takdisc/WMD
- 2003 Under The Tree (Last Call)

=== Collaborations ===
- 1994 Songs of awakening / Roads of blessings (The Lama's Chant) (w/Lama Gyourmé) - (Last Call/Narada/Takticmusic)
- 1996 Souhaits Pour L'Eveil (The Lama's Chant) (w/Lama Gyurme) - (Last Call/Sony)
- 2000 Rain Of Blessings: Vajra Chants (w/Lama Gyurme) - (RealWorld)
- 2018 Kangaba-Paris (w/Lansine Kouyate) - (Buda Musique)

=== Participations ===
- 1977 Vous Et Nous - Brigitte Fontaine
- 1978 New Jerusalem - Tim Blake
- 1979 Open - Steve Hillage - (Virgin)
- 1981 Friends Of Mr. Cairo - Jon & Vangelis - (Polydor)
- 1983 Catherine Lara - Catherine Lara - (Trema)
- 1984 En Concert - Catherine Lara - (Trema)
- 1985 Apartheid - Xalam (band) - (Melodie)
- 1985 Nelson Mandela - Youssou N'Dour - (EMI)
- 1986 Power Spot - Jon Hassell - (ECM)
- 1987 Faton-Bloom - F.Cahen/D.Malherbe - (Cryonic)
- 1987 Soro - Salif Keita - (EMI)
- 1987 Xarit - Xalam - (BMG)
- 1988 I'm Your Man - Leonard Cohen - (Sony)
- 1988 Surgeon Of The Nightsky - Jon Hassell - (Intutition)
- 1989 Domba - Ousemane Kouyaté - (Sterns)
- 1989 Fetish - Didier Malherbe - (Mantra)
- 1990 French Corazon - Brigitte Fontaine - (EMI)
- 1992 Eyes Open - Youssou N'Dour - (Sony)
- 1993 Les Romantiques - Catherine Lara - (Trema)
- 1993 Zef - Didier Malherbe - (Tangram)
- 1994 Soro - - Salif Keita - (Island)
- 1994 Wommat - Youssou N'Dour - (Sony)
- 1995 Emotion - Papa Wemba - (Real World)
- 1995 Folon - Salif Keita - (Island)
- 1996 Kaoutal - Kaoutal - (Sony)
- 1996 Mansa - Super Rail Band - (Label Bleu)
- 1996 Vago - Marcel Loeffler - (Tam Tam)
- 1996 Wapi Yo - - Lokua Kanza - (BMG)
- 1997 Contes D'Afrique De L'Ouest - Mamadou Diallo - (CKT)
- 1998 Castles made of sand - Alexkid - (F-Communications)
- 1998 Paradis Païen - Jacques Higelin (Tôt ou Tard/Warner)
- 1999 Papa - Salif Keita - (Island)
- 2000 Joko - Youssou N'Dour - (Sony)
- 2001 Bienvenida - Alexkid (F-Communications)
- 2001 Kekeland - Brigitte Fontaine (Virgin)
- 2001 What I did On My Holidays - Alexkid (F-Communications)
- 2002 Nothing's In Vain - Youssou N'Dour (Nonesuch/Warner)
- 2002 Samba Alla - Diogal (Celluloid/Mélodie)
- 2002 Wati - Amadou & Mariam (Universal Music Jazz)
- 2003 Mint - Alexkid - (F-Communications)
