= Mati Klarwein =

German painter (1932–2002)

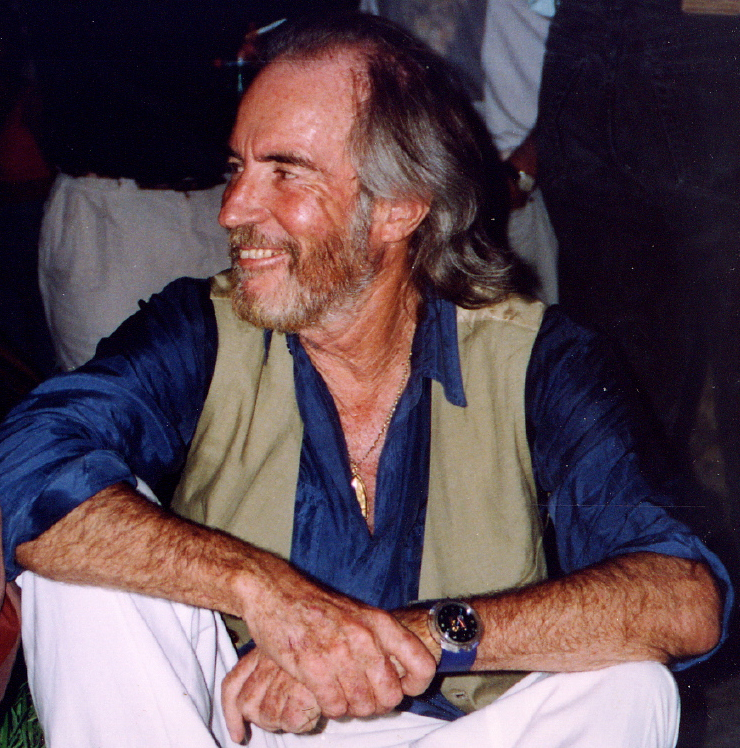
- Klarwein in 1990
- Born: Matthias Klarwein; 9 April 1932; Hamburg, Weimar Republic
- Died: 7 March 2002 (aged 69); Deià, Mallorca, Spain
- Education: Académie Julian, École des Beaux-Arts, Paris
- Known for: Painting, drawing, film
- Notable work: Annunciation (1961); Grain of Sand (1963–1965); Bitches Brew (1969); Aleph Sanctuary (1963–1970)
- Movement: Surrealism, Fantastic Realism, Visionary art

Abdul Mati Klarwein (9 April 1932 – 7 March 2002) was a German painter best known for his works used on the covers of music albums.

== Personal life ==
Mati Klarwein was born in Hamburg, Weimar Republic. His mother Elsa Kühne was an opera singer and his father Joseph Klarwein was a Brick Expressionist architect and later with the Bauhaus movement. His father was Jewish and his family fled to the British Mandate of Palestine when he was two years old, after the rise of Nazi Germany. In 1948, after his parents' divorce, Mati and his mother emigrated to Paris when Israel declared independence. In Paris, Mati studied from 1949 to 1951 with Fernand Léger, and attended the art schools École des Beaux-Arts and Académie Julian. Klarwein said, "My ambition was to go to Hollywood and become a movie director, but instead I went to Paris and studied painting for Fernand Léger. I realise Fernand's greatness, but he was never any direct source of inspiration to me. His main contribution to my artistic development was introducing me to the art of Salvador Dalí. The movie Un Chien Andalou virtually took my breath away."

Klarwein added "Abdul" (which means "servant of-" in Arabic) to his name in the late 1950s to express his sentiments about the hostility between Jews and Muslims in the Middle East: he felt that to understand each other better, every Jew should adopt a Muslim first name, and vice versa. In 1956 he met Kitty Lillaz, and traveled with her around the world, including Tibet, India, Bali, North Africa, Turkey, Europe and the Americas.

In the early 1960s, he settled for a while in New York City, meeting Jimi Hendrix. At a New York exhibition in 1961, organized by Lillaz for the unveiling of the painting Flight to Egypt, Klarwein met Salvador Dalí for the first time, whom he called a spiritual father. The same year he met his wife Sophie (née Bollack, also known as Sofi). Among other painters he met more often was Arik Brauer. In 1965, he obtained French citizenship with the support of André Malraux.

== Style and technique ==
During his time in Saint-Tropez he met Ernst Fuchs, who would have a profound influence on his technique, teaching him the Mischtechnik. Much of Klarwein's most famous work is inspired by surrealism and pop culture, but also reflects his interest in deities and symbolism.

Klarwein is still best known for his art of the 1960s and 1970s, with its clear links to surrealism, popular psychedelic imagery, ethnic and exotic themes, erotic, and religious art from a number of different traditions. He also worked more conventionally across a variety of genres including still life, landscape, and portrait.

== Career ==
The art and culture magazine Juxtapoz, quoting an unnamed source, wrote that Klarwein was "often considered 'the man literally responsible for every great, legendary record cover you've ever seen—if he didn't do it, he inspired it.'" Despite the hyperbole of this claim, it is true that many people would immediately recognize his vivid, colourful style from many album covers. Andy Warhol is reported to have said that Mati Klarwein was his favourite painter.

=== 1960s ===
During the '60s, Klarwein's fame grew, and some of the decade's most progressive musicians used his artwork for their album covers.

In his painting Grain of Sand (1963–1965), many disparate images are combined together in one massive, yet oddly coherent work. Klarwein's own words illuminate the work: "I projected it as a sort of painted musical comedy movie with a Sanskrit swinging cast of thousands, starring Marilyn Monroe, Anita Ekberg, Ray Charles, Pablo Picasso, Brigitte Bardot, Roland Kirk, Cannonball Adderley, Ahmed Abdul Malik, Wonder Woman, Delacroix's Orphan Girl at the Cemetery, Litri and his bullfighters, Lawrence of Arabia, Socrates, Dalí, Rama, Vishnu, Ganesh, the Zork and a Milky Way of Playmates."

=== 1970s ===
Mati Klarwein's artwork for gatefold cover of Miles Davis's Bitches Brew (1969).

Klarwein produced comparably striking designs for the covers of two Miles Davis albums, Bitches Brew (1970) and Live-Evil (1971).

Mati Klarwein's artwork for cover of Time Magazine, 2 February 1970, illustrating the face of Barry Commoner

Klarwein created the cover for the 2 February 1970 Time magazine issue, showing the face of Barry Commoner, projecting a powerful image of ecology, which took the stage for the first time in the public eye.

Klarwein's painting Annunciation from 1961 was seen in reproduction by the musician Carlos Santana, who subsequently used it in 1970 as the cover image of his band Santana's second album Abraxas.

His painting Zonked (1970) was originally planned as the cover image for Betty Davis's self-titled album, and was later used for the Last Poets album Holy Terror in 1993. In 1971 his cover was on the album Last Days and Time by Earth, Wind & Fire. A cover he made for Jimi Hendrix was used on a single in 1974 and for a compilation in 2010.

In 1971 he went to Hamburg and created set paintings for the film Hermann Hesse's Steppenwolf. In the mid-1970s, Klarwein began a series of paintings which he referred to as "real-estate paintings" or "inscapes". In the late 1970s, he collaborated with trumpeter Jon Hassell for a couple of albums on Brian Eno's Ambient label; these albums used several of Klarwein's "inscapes" on their covers.

The association of his images with these successful and widely admired musicians of the time made Klarwein's work known outside the circle of lovers of contemporary art. Many of these paintings, and others, were included in Klarwein's first book Milk n' Honey (1973).

=== 1980s and later ===
In the 1980s, Klarwein began to focus on landscape compositions, which were detailed, had different perspectives and often included floric textures. During the 1980s and 1990s, Klarwein would occasionally search for cheap paintings at flea markets and "improve" them, painting over them or adding things at his whim. Klarwein made over a hundred of these "improved paintings" throughout his career. In 1983, he published Inscapes Real-Estate Paintings, which included an interview where Klarwein said about his work, "Some visual artworks are made to be talked about more than to be seen, others are made to be seen more than to be talked about. I think I belong in the latter category."

Klarwein also painted many commissioned portraits, including Robert Graves, Noël Coward, Juliette Binoche, Richard Gere, Michael Douglas and Brigitte Bardot. He died of cancer on 7 March 2002, in Deià, on the Spanish island of Mallorca.

== Album covers ==
- Gregg Allman - Laid Back (1973) (cover)
- Joe Beck - Beck (1975)
- Leonard Bernstein - Age of Anxiety (1966)
- The Chambers Brothers - New Generation (1970)
- Miles Davis - Bitches Brew (1970)[2LP]
- Miles Davis - Live-Evil (1971)[2LP] (cover)
- Aïyb Dieng/Bill Laswell - Rhythmagick (1997) (cover)
- Eric Dolphy - Iron Man (1963) (cover)
- George Duke - Secret Rendezvous (1984)
- Mark Egan - Mosaic (1985)
- Earth, Wind & Fire - Last Days and Time (1972) (cover)
- Elements - Illumination (1987)
- Elements - Forward Motion (1984)
- Jon Hassell - Earthquake Island (1978)
- Jon Hassell - Dream Theory in Malaya: Fourth World Volume Two (1981) (cover)
- Jon Hassell - Listening to Pictures (2018) (cover)
- Jon Hassell - Maarifa Street: Magic Realism Volume Two (2005)
- Jon Hassell - Aka/Darbari/Java: Magic Realism (1983) (cover)
- Jon Hassell - Seeing Through Sound (2020) (cover)
- Jam & Spoon (feat. Plavka) - Kaleidoscope (1997)
- Igor Kipnis/Neville Marriner - (Bach, composer) The Complete Concertos for Harpsichord and Orchestra (1978)
- The Last Poets - This Is Madness (1971) (cover)
- The Last Poets - Holy Terror (1993)
- Maids of Gravity - The First Second (1996)
- Malcolm X - By Any Means Necessary (1971)
- Jackie McLean - Demon's Dance (1970) (cover)
- Buddy Miles - Message to the People (1971)
- Buddy Miles - Buddy Miles "Live" (1971)[2LP]
- Buddy Miles Express - Hell and Back (1994)
- The Mooney Suzuki - Alive & Amplified (2004) (cover)
- Osibisa - Heads (1972) (cover)
- Hermeto Pascoal e Grupo - Só Não Toca Quem Não Quer (Only If You Don't Want It) (1987)
- Santana - Abraxas (1970) (painting title, Annunciation) (cover)
- Michael Shrieve - Two Doors (1996)
- Symphonic Slam - Symphonic Slam (1976)
- Tempest - Living in Fear (1974) (cover)
- Per Tjernberg & Mati Klarwein - No Man's Land (1997)
- Per Tjernberg - Universal Riddim (2000)
- Per Tjernberg - Universal Riddim 2 (2005)
- Howard Wales & Jerry Garcia - Hooteroll? (1971) (cover)
- Reuben Wilson - Blue Mode (recorded 1969, released 1970) (cover)
- White Lightnin' - White Lightnin' (1975)

== Bibliography ==
- Milk n' Honey (1973) Harmony Books, New York
- God Jokes (1976) Harmony Books, New York
- Inscapes: Real-Estate Paintings (1983) Harmony Books, New York
- Collected Works 1959-1975 (1988) Raymond Martin Press, Germany
- A Thousand Windows and Improved Paintings: Bad Paintings Made Gooder (1995) Max Publishing, Spain
- Improved Paintings 1979-2000 (2000) Max Publishing, Spain
- Paradise Lost and Found (2005) Consell de Mallorca, Spain ISBN 84-96430-13-8
- Mati & the Music - 52 Album Covers (2012) 213 Librairies, France ISBN 9788492480197
