= Power Spot =

Studio album by Jon Hassell
- Released: 1986
- Recorded: October 1983 and December 1984
- Length: 47:43
- Label: ECM
- Producer: Brian Eno and Daniel Lanois

Jon Hassell chronology
Aka / Darbari / Java: Magic Realism (1983)	Power Spot (1986)	The Surgeon of the Nightsky Restores Dead Things by the Power of Sound (1987)

Power Spot is an album by the American trumpet player and composer Jon Hassell. It was released in 1986 through ECM Records. It was recorded in 1983 and 1984.

The cover art reproduces the Whirling Snakes or Whirling Mountain sandpainting of the Navajo Shooting Chant, one of the most important and most complex of the Navajo healing ceremonies.

== Reception ==
The Allmusic review by Mark Kirschenmann awarded the album 4 stars stating "While not as stunning as Possible Musics, Power Spot is nonetheless one of the most significant recordings from this utterly unique musician".

Professional ratings
Review scores
Source	Rating
Allmusic	4/5 stars

== Track listing ==
All compositions by Jon Hassell

1. "Power Spot" - 7:07
2. "Passage D.E." - 5:25
3. "Solaire" - 6:49
4. "Miracle Steps" - 4:21
5. "Wing Melodies" - 7:33
6. "The Elephant and the Orchid" - 11:08
7. "Air" - 5:20

Recorded at Grant Avenue Studio in Hamilton, Canada in October 1983 and December 1984

== Personnel ==
- Jon Hassell - trumpet
- J. A. Deane - acoustic and electronic percussion, alto flute
- Jean-Philippe Rykiel - electronic keyboards, facsimile bass, percussion, strings, etc.
- Michael Brook - guitar, electronic treatments (tracks 1, 2 & 6)
- Richard Horowitz - electronic keyboards (tracks 1 & 2)
- Brian Eno - electric bass (tracks 3 & 5)
- Richard Armin, Paul Armin - RAAD electro-acoustic strings (tracks 2 & 4)
- Miguel Frasconi - flute (track 7)
