= K3CS =

Studio album by Peter Freeman
- Released: April 1, 2022
- Studio: Game Room Studios West and River Rock Sound
- Genre: Avant-garde
- Length: 101:00
- Label: zOaR Records
- Producer: Peter Freeman

Peter Freeman chronology
The Vertical Collection (1997)	K3CS (2022)

K3CS is a studio double album by Peter Freeman. It was released posthumously on the zOaR Records label on April 1, 2022. The album is composed of two records, Sinistar and Mercurial. Sinistar was a record that Freeman had finished prior to his death in 2021 but was unreleased. Mercurial was an unreleased record from 2000, composed entirely of highly processed bass sounds. The album, K3CS, was named after Freeman's amateur radio callsign.

== Track listing ==
All tracks are written by Peter Freeman

No.	Title	Length
1.	"NuTornado"	8:17
2.	"A Burnished Cordial Deception"	1:06
3.	"Clavilux"	10:16
4.	"A Pewter Tint"	7:30
5.	"Three Days Later"	7:08
6.	"Deeper Dub"	6:42
7.	"Mercurial 01"	5:24
8.	"Mercurial 02"	9:21
9.	"Mercurial 03"	6:37
10.	"Mercurial 04"	7:41
11.	"Soundscape"	31:19

== Personnel ==
Credits adapted from liner notes.

Musicians

- Peter Freeman – bass, electronics, guitar
- Rick Cox – electric guitar
- Knox Chandler - electric guitar
- Jamie Muhoberac – keyboards
- Sterling Campbell – drums
- Jeff Martin - guitar

Technical personnel

- Peter Freeman – production
- Anton Sanko – post-production / consultation
- Elliott Sharp – post-production / consultation
- Bryce Goggin - recording, additional engineering
- Victoria Faust – cover photos
- Rick Cox – additional images
- Pasquale Carbonaro - rear cover photo
