= Flash of the Spirit =

Studio album by Jon Hassell/Farafina
- Released: 1988
- Labels: Intuition; Capitol
- Producers: Brian Eno, Daniel Lanois, Jon Hassell

Flash of the Spirit is an album by the American musician Jon Hassell and the Burkinabé musicians Farafina. It was released in 1988, with an American release the following year. A remastered edition was released in 2020.

The album takes its title from the art historian Robert Farris Thompson's book of the same name, an influential study of "African and Afro-American art and philosophy", as the subtitle calls it.

== Production ==
The album was produced by Brian Eno, Daniel Lanois, and Hassell. J. A. Deane played electronic drums. The title track was included on Intuition and Capitol Records' The World Music Album.

== Critical reception ==
Professional ratings
Review scores
Source	Rating
AllMusic	2/5 stars
Chicago Tribune	4/4 stars
Robert Christgau	B−
The Encyclopedia of Popular Music	3/5 stars
MusicHound World: The Essential Album Guide	4.5/5 stars

Robert Christgau determined that "the aural environment neither flashes nor fuses—rather than a 'forced collision of cultures,' it sounds like they just barely missed each other." The Chicago Tribune wrote that the album finds Hassell "lofting filigreed, electronically expanded trumpet lines and titanium cloud-chords above ethereal musical settings."

The Boston Globe deemed Flash of the Spirit "tribal music from the global village, sensual, earthy and high tech." The Omaha World-Herald concluded that Hassell "sounds warmer than usual because of the rhythmic density of Farafina ... Hassell's sound, altered and enhanced by electronics, bends and blares."

AllMusic called the album "a near set of dance tunes."

== Track listing ==
No.	Title	Length
1.	"Flash of the Spirit (Laughter)"
2.	"Night Moves (Fear)"
3.	"Air Afrique (Wind)"
4.	"Out Pours (Kongo) Blue (Prayer)"
5.	"Kaboo (Play)"
6.	"(Like) Warriors Everywhere (Courage)"
7.	"Dreamworld (Dance)"
8.	"Tales of the Near Future (Clairvoyance)"
9.	"A Vampire Dances (Symmetry)"
10.	"Masque (Strength)"
