= The Million Dollar Hotel (soundtrack) =

The Million Dollar Hotel: Music from the Motion Picture

Soundtrack album from the film The Million Dollar Hotel by various artists
- Released: 13 March 2000
- Recorded: 1999 (original material)
- Genres: Electronic, jazz, rock
- Length: 55:43
- Languages: English, Spanish ("Anarchy in the USA")
- Label: Island / Interscope
- Producers: Hal Willner (original soundtrack material) and Bono, The Edge, Brian Eno, Flood, Jon Hassell, Daniel Lanois, Danny Saber (pre-recorded music)

Singles from The Million Dollar Hotel: Music from the Motion Picture
- 1. "The Ground Beneath Her Feet" Released: 8 February 2000

The Million Dollar Hotel: Music from the Motion Picture is the soundtrack to the 2000 film The Million Dollar Hotel. The album was released alongside the film in March 2000, and featured Bono as its executive producer, with new music from U2 and other artists.

== Composition ==
The lyrics of "The Ground Beneath Her Feet" were written by Salman Rushdie, based on his book of the same name. The soundtrack version of the song is a different mix from the one used in the film, which was not released commercially. Along with "Stateless", "The Ground Beneath Her Feet" was recorded during sessions for U2's All That You Can't Leave Behind album. "The Ground Beneath Her Feet" was later released as a bonus track on Australian, British, and Japanese versions of All That You Can't Leave Behind. "Stateless" was later released on the Unreleased & Rare album of U2's digital box set, The Complete U2. "The First Time" originally appeared on U2's 1993 Zooropa album. The version on the soundtrack is identical to the one on the album.

Jon Hassell's "Amsterdam Blue (Cortége)" was originally recorded as a tribute to Chet Baker and submitted to Bono and director Wim Wenders, who made the song a pivotal part of the soundtrack. "Anarchy in the USA" is a Spanish cover of the Sex Pistols' 1976 "Anarchy in the U.K." The film also features the Hal Wilner track "Nyack Oud Dance" which is not on the soundtrack—the song previously appeared on his album Whoops, I'm an Indian.

== Reception ==
Stephen Thomas Erlewine of Allmusic gave the album three out of five stars, noting that, "It's easy to get lost in the slow, dark crawl of the music," but "once the soundtrack loses momentum, it never regains its forward motion." Entertainment Weekly gave it a C, claiming that the non-U2 material was either "admirable but dull... or simply dull." Jeffrey Gantz of The Boston Phoenix gave the album three out of four stars remarking that the strongest tracks are the U2 songs and the rest of the soundtrack provides, "a yearning LA noir atmosphere... but doesn't contribute much on its own."

== Track listing ==
No.	Title	Writer(s)	Performer(s)	Length
1.	"The Ground Beneath Her Feet"	Salman Rushdie (lyrics), U2 (music)	U2, Daniel Lanois	3:43
2.	"Never Let Me Go"	Bono, Nicholas Klein (lyrics), Jon Hassell, Daniel Lanois, Bono, Brian Eno (music)	Bono, The Million Dollar Hotel Band	5:35
3.	"Stateless"	Bono (lyrics), U2 (music)	U2	4:05
4.	"Satellite of Love"	Lou Reed	Milla Jovovich, The Million Dollar Hotel Band	4:11
5.	"Falling at Your Feet"	Bono, Daniel Lanois	Bono, Daniel Lanois	4:54
6.	"Tom Tom's Dream"	Jon Hassell	The Million Dollar Hotel Band	1:52
7.	"The First Time"	Bono (lyrics), U2 (music)	U2	3:43
8.	"Bathtub"	Brian Eno, Bill Frisell, Jon Hassell	The Million Dollar Hotel Band	1:06
9.	"The First Time" (Reprise)	U2	Daniel Lanois, The Million Dollar Hotel Band	2:05
10.	"Tom Tom's Room"	Brad Mehldau, Daniel Lanois, Bill Frisell	Brad Mehldau, Bill Frisell	2:24
11.	"Funny Face"	Bill Frisell, Greg Cohen, Brian Eno, Adam Dorn, Brian Blade	The Million Dollar Hotel Band	0:32
12.	"Dancin' Shoes"	Bono, Nicholas Klein (lyrics), Daniel Lanois, Bono (music)	Bono, The Million Dollar Hotel Band	2:06
13.	"Amsterdam Blue (Cortège)"	Jon Hassell	Jon Hassell, Gregg Arreguin, Jamie Muhoberac, Peter Freeman	9:18
14.	"Satellite of Love" (Reprise)	Lou Reed	The Million Dollar Hotel Band, Daniel Lanois, Bill Frisell, Greg Cohen	1:06
15.	"Satellite of Love" (Danny Saber Remix)	Lou Reed	Milla Jovovich, Jon Hassell, Danny Saber	5:13
16.	"Anarchy in the USA"	Stephen Jones, Johnny Rotten, Paul Thomas Cook, Glen Matlock	Tito Larriva, The Million Dollar Hotel Band	3:37
Total length:				55:43

== Personnel ==
U2

- Bono – lead vocals, guitar, production (track 4)
- Adam Clayton – bass guitar
- The Edge – guitar, keyboards, backing vocals, production (7)
- Larry Mullen Jr. – drums, percussion

The Million Dollar Hotel Band

- Brian Blade – drums, percussion
- Greg Cohen – bass guitar
- Adam Dorn – beats, synthesizers, programming
- Brian Eno – keyboards, production (tracks 1–3, 7)
- Bill Frisell – guitar
- Jon Hassell – trumpet, production (13)
- Daniel Lanois – guitar, vocals, pedal steel, production (1–3, 5, 9, 12)

Additional personnel

- Gregg Arreguin
- Flood – production (track 7)
- Tim Palmer – mixing (1)
- Peter Freeman
- Milla Jovovich – vocals (15)
- Tito Larriva – vocals (16)
- Brad Mehldau – piano
- Jamie Muhoberac – keyboards
- Danny Saber – production (15)
- Hal Willner – production (4–6, 8–12, 14, 16)

== Certifications ==
Region	Certification	Certified units/sales
Canada (Music Canada)	Gold	50,000^{^}
^{^} Shipments figures based on certification alone.
