= Dream Theory in Malaya: Fourth World Volume Two =

Studio album by Jon Hassell
- Released: 1981
- Recorded: 1981
- Studios: Grant Avenue Studio, Hamilton, Ontario
- Genres: World fusion, minimal, experimental, transethnicism
- Length: 36:25
- Label: EG EGED 13, Caroline (US)
- Producers: Jon Hassell; assisted by Bob and Daniel Lanois

Jon Hassell chronology
Fourth World, Vol. 1: Possible Musics (1980)	Dream Theory in Malaya: Fourth World Volume Two (1981)	Aka / Darbari / Java: Magic Realism (1983)

Professional ratings
Review scores
Source	Rating
AllMusic	3/5 stars
Pitchfork	8.4/10

Dream Theory in Malaya: Fourth World Volume Two is an album by Jon Hassell, released in 1981. It is the sequel to his collaboration with Brian Eno, Fourth World Vol. 1: Possible Musics, which was released the previous year. The recording draws influence from the culture of the Senoi people of Malaya.

A 2017 reissue on the label Glitterbeat was named Best New Reissue by Pitchfork.

== Overview ==
Hassell got the idea for the album after reading a paper by anthropologist / adventurer-ethnologist Kilton Stewart about the Senoi, an aboriginal tribe Stewart first visited in 1935, who lived in the highlands of Malaya (as it was known before the present state of Malaysia was constructed).

The Senoi culture, he discovered, regarded dreams as an important part of life. Mornings were used by families to indulge in the custom of dream-telling, where, for instance, a "child's fearful dream of falling was praised as a gift to learn to fly the next night". Songs and dances learned in dreams were often taught to neighbouring tribes to foster good relations.

One of the tribes who lived nearby in the swamp regions, the Semelai people, practiced the art of splashing water with the hands to form a rhythmic music. Hassell heard recordings of this on a BBC publication - a book (Primitive Peoples) which was accompanied by a vinyl record - and used it as "a thematic guide for the entire recording", especially the track "Malay", "the centerpiece of the record".

== The music ==
The album was recorded at Grant Avenue Studio, Hamilton, Ontario, Canada, with the engineering and production help of Bob and Daniel Lanois.

Hassell would experiment with "musical sketches" in the basement studio of Michael Brook's house in Toronto, who was helping him to coordinate the recording, and from there he'd commute to Grant Avenue and put things down on multitrack, along with Brian Eno who was also there. Eno's main input on the sessions was playing drums and bells on "Courage," "Dream Theory," and "These Times". These sessions also marked Hassell's first association with Lanois.

He spent a lot of time on an "invented exotic scale on top of a Tanpura-like drone consisting of a set of sine tones that I've tuned as a guide to keep me on the Indonesian-type tuning that nobody ever tried to play on a trumpet before". Hassell's unique playing style is additionally mixed, layered, looped and stretched so that it never really sounds like a trumpet at all.

"Chor Moiré" features digital delay, which at the time was a relatively new studio process, and is composed of rhythmic loops, short trumpet blasts and sharp intonations. "Courage" and "Dream Theory" share a raspy, treated, looped trumpet riff, with 3 employing waves of overdubs, bass and pottery drums. "Datu Bintung at Jelong" is based on a background of gongs and drums over which a breathy, distorted trumpet drones and blasts. The longest track, "Malay", features the sampled and looped "splash" rhythms mentioned above, along with occasional giggling of the people playing in the water, plus pottery drum, bowl gongs, and an over-riding lead trumpet. "These Times..." is the most ambient of all, being mostly chimes, gongs and birdsong. A year later, its trumpet solo reappeared in "Shadow", on Brian Eno's album Ambient 4/On Land. "Gift of Fire" finally has a background of distorted trumpet waves and a gamelan-style beat.

Andy Gill noted the album has "Spookily delayed trumpets, primitive drum machines, [and] bone-shaking bass.

== Track listing ==
All tracks written by Jon Hassell.

1. "Chor Moiré" – 2:21
2. "Courage" – 3:38
3. "Dream Theory" – 5:15
4. "Datu Bintung at Jelong" – 7:05
5. "Malay" – 10:12
6. "These Times..." – 2:53
7. "Gift of Fire" – 5:01

An early 1980s EG cassette also included an extra track, "Ordinary Mind", located between "Datu Bintung at Jelong" and "Malay". A 2017 CD issue adds it at the end of the original LP track sequence.

== Personnel ==
- Jon Hassell – trumpet, pottery drums ("Malay", "Fire"), Prophet 5 ("Datu Bintung"), bowl gongs ("Fire")
- Brian Eno – drums ("Courage", "Dream Theory"), bowl gongs & bells ("Malay", "These Times...")
- Michael Brook – bass ("Courage", "Dream Theory")
- Miguel Frasconi – bowl gongs ("Malay")
- Walter De Maria – distant drum ("Courage")

Production

- Jon Hassell – production; mix ("Courage", "Fire")
- Daniel Lanois – engineering; mix ("Datu Bintung")
- Greg Roberts – additional engineering
- Andrew Timar – frog bog recording
- Paul Fitzgerald – splash rhythm edit assistant
- Brian Eno – mix ("Chor Moiré", "Dream Theory", "Malay", "These Times...")
- Greg Calbi – mastering
- Michael Brook – project co-ordinator
- Paula Greif – design
- Jimmy De Sana – photograph
- Mati Klarwein – cover painting (Alexander's Dream)

== Versions ==
Country	Label	Cat. No.	Media	Release date
US	Editions EG	EGM 114	LP	1981
France	Editions EG	2335 226	LP	1981
US/UK	Editions EG	EG/EEGCD-13	LP/CD	1987
US	Plan 9/Caroline	1537	CD	1987
US	Plan 9/Caroline	1571	CD	1990
US	Editions EG	13	CD	1991
US	EG	13	CD	1999
Germany	Glitter Beat	GBLP 052	LP/CD	2017
