= Vernal Equinox (album) =

Studio album by Jon Hassell
- Released: 1977
- Recorded: October 1976 – October 1977
- Studio: Various: York University Electronic Media Studios; (Ontario, CA); Mastertone Recording Studios; (New York City, WA)
- Genre: Ambient
- Length: 51:03
- Label: Lovely Music, Ltd.
- Producer: Jon Hassell

Jon Hassell chronology
Vernal Equinox (1977)	Earthquake Island (1978)

Professional ratings
Review scores
Source	Rating
AllMusic	3.5/5 stars
Pitchfork	8.8/10

Vernal Equinox is the debut studio album by Jon Hassell, released in 1977 by Lovely Music, Ltd. In 2016, the album was ranked number 47 on Pitchfork's top 50 best ambient albums of all time list.

== Track listing ==
All music is composed by Jon Hassell.

Side one
No.	Title	Length
1.	"Toucan Ocean"	3:42
2.	"Viva Shona"	7:04
3.	"Hex"	6:20
4.	"Blues Nile"	9:51

Side two
No.	Title	Length
1.	"Vernal Equinox"	21:56
2.	"Caracas Night September 11, 1975"	2:10

== Critical reception ==
In 2016, Vernal Equinox was ranked number 47 on Pitchfork's "Top 50 Best Ambient Albums of All Time" list.

In 2020, Pitchfork reviewed the album, stating: "When Jon Hassell coined the term “Fourth World” to describe his work, he fabricated a musical universe that new artists still call home. Melding the work of minimalists like La Monte Young and Terry Riley with non-Western folk, avant-garde classical and electronic, and early-’70s electric Miles Davis, the trumpeter and composer arrived more or less fully formed in 1977 with his solo debut."

== Personnel ==
Adapted from the Vernal Equinox liner notes.

- Jon Hassell – trumpet, electric piano (A1, A3), production

Musicians

- Miguel Frasconi – bells and claves (A3)
- Andy Jerison – synthesizer (A3)
- Nicolas Kilbourn – mbira and talking drum (A3)
- David Rosenboom – synthesizer (A1, A3), mbira (A2), rattles (A3), goblet drum (B1), recording
- Naná Vasconcelos – congas (A1, B1, B2), shakers (A1, A3), bells (A2), talking drum (A2)
- William Winant – kanjira and rattles (A3)

Production and additional personnel

- Michael Brook – recording
- Andy Jerison – recording
- Rich LePage – mixing
- Ariel Peeri – design

== Release history ==
Region	Date	Label	Format	Catalog
United States	1977	Lovely Music, Ltd.	LP	1021
United States	1990	Lovely Music, Ltd.	CD	1021
