= CBGB OMFUG Masters: Live June 29, 2001: The Bowery Collection =

Live album by The Mooney Suzuki
- Released: March 18, 2008
- Recorded: June 29, 2001 at CBGB, New York City, New York
- Genre: Rock, garage rock, indie rock
- Length: 29:03
- Label: MVD

The Mooney Suzuki chronology
Have Mercy (2007)	CBGB OMFUG Masters: Live June 29, 2001: The Bowery Collection (2008)

CBGB OMFUG Masters: Live June 29, 2001: The Bowery Collection is the first live album by American garage rock band The Mooney Suzuki, released on March 18, 2008.

== Track listing ==
1. "It's Showtime, Pt. 1" – 1:59
2. "In a Young Man's Mind" – 2:57
3. "Singin' a Song About Today" – 4:03
4. "Natural Fact" – 2:52
5. "Everything's Gone Wrong" – 1:56
6. "Half of My Heart" – 4:53
7. "Oh Sweet Susanna" – 3:20
8. "Make My Way" – 3:30
9. "A Little Bit of Love" – 3:03
10. "I Woke Up This Mornin'" – 4:00

== Personnel ==
The Mooney Suzuki

- Sammy James Jr. – vocals, guitar
- Graham Tyler – guitar
- John Paul Ribas – bass
- Will Rockwell-Scott – drums

Additional personnel

- John Joh – design
- Dustin Pittman – photography
- "Handsome Dick" Manitoba – liner notes
