= The Ground Beneath Her Feet (song) =

2000 song by U2 and Daniel Lanois

- Cover of the US promotional single

Promotional single by U2 with Daniel Lanois

from the album The Million Dollar Hotel: Music from the Motion Picture
- Released: 8 February 2000
- Genre: Rock
- Length: 3:44
- Label: Island / Interscope
- Composer: U2
- Lyricist: Salman Rushdie
- Producers: Daniel Lanois, Brian Eno

"The Ground Beneath Her Feet" is a song by Irish rock band U2. It appears in the 2000 film The Million Dollar Hotel, which was produced by U2 lead vocalist Bono, and the song was included on the film's soundtrack. Author Salman Rushdie is credited as the lyricist, as the words are taken from his 1999 book The Ground Beneath Her Feet. Written during the recording sessions for U2's album All That You Can't Leave Behind (2000), the song features Daniel Lanois, who played pedal steel guitar. A different mix from the soundtrack version appears in the film. "The Ground Beneath Her Feet" was released as a promotional single in February 2000, reaching number two on the US Billboard Adult Alternative Songs chart, number 22 in Canada, and number one in Iceland.

== Writing ==
Author Salman Rushdie's novel The Ground Beneath Her Feet contains lyrics for a song of the same name. In the novel, the fictional character Ormus Cama writes the lyrics as a lamentation for his lover, Vina Apsara. After completing the novel, Rushdie sent a copy of the manuscript to U2 lead vocalist Bono and asked him to set the song lyrics to music. According to Bono, he developed the song's melody as soon as he first read the lyrics. During a dinner break in the recording sessions for U2's album All That You Can't Leave Behind (2000), Bono and producer Daniel Lanois remained in the studio and recorded a version of the song. Bono said, "I sang the melody and it was all there." Lanois said: "It's a lovely song to sing with just an acoustic guitar. That's the mark of a good song, isn't it? That's probably the way the song should have been presented." Lanois played pedal steel guitar on the song, and guitarist the Edge added a guitar riff. U2 manager Paul McGuinness confirmed in January 1999 that a demo of the song had been recorded and that the group were hoping to release it. In an April 1999 issue of Rolling Stone, the Edge said: "The bones of it are there, but we're still in development. We're very excited about it."

Ultimately, the rest of the band were unconvinced by the song. They pejoratively called it a "salad" (the group's term for a ballad) and questioned whether they needed another one for All That You Can't Leave Behind. The Edge said the song seemed unnecessary because the band "already had so many great ballads". Bono subsequently received permission to use the song for The Million Dollar Hotel, a motion picture he was producing. The Edge thought it was the perfect use for the track, since it was not intended for U2's pending record.

Rushdie, himself, was very pleased with the song, claiming it had "some of the most beautiful melodies [Bono] had ever come up with." In reference to the song, Rushdie said, "So I always knew, you know, that it wasn't going to be an uptempo foot-tapper, because it's a sad song. I think it sounds like, I hope, one of those big U2 ballads for which Bono's voice, actually, is beautifully well suited." U2 uses Rushdie's lyrics almost word for word, except for omitting the following line:

She was my ground, my favorite sound, my country road, my city street, my sky above, my only love, and the ground beneath my feet.

== Promotion and releases ==
McGuinness said that there was interest in releasing the song to promote Rushdie's novel, well before the completion of All That You Can't Leave Behind; one plan called for the song to be published online to coincide with the 13 April 1999 release of the novel as a promotional tie-in. The song debuted in a performance by Bono and the Edge on a Rushdie-centric episode of the BBC Two television series Arena that aired on 22 April 1999.

After The Million Dollar Hotel, the band wanted to release the song to promote the film. Accordingly, a music video was created, directed by the film's director Wim Wenders. The video was shot in one day in the Sandyford Mountains near Dublin, Ireland; Wenders used a Sony CineAlta HDW-F900 digital video camera at 24 frames per second with specially developed lenses by Panavision and captured it on the HDCAM format.

Plans for a single release changed after Island Records president Marc Marot viewed The Million Dollar Hotel. He thought the film was poor and recounted the uncomfortable experience of sitting next to Bono in a Dublin theatre having to give his opinion. Marot told McGuinness, "You shouldn't go anywhere near it." He offered to include "The Ground Beneath Her Feet" on the film's soundtrack but advocated not releasing the single to avoid drawing attention to a film that he thought would not do well, telling Bono, "it will cause you embarrassment". Ultimately, no single was commercially released.

After the song's release on the film's soundtrack, U2 hoped to feature the song on their newest album, All That You Can't Leave Behind, but instead the song was only released as a bonus track on the United Kingdom, Australian and Japanese releases of the album.

== Reception ==
Steve Matteo of Newsday called the song "a haunting track of rousing, visceral majesty that can stand alongside anything U2 has recorded". Rob Brunner of Entertainment Weekly rated the song a C+, calling it "so ordinary" and saying, "Eno's sonic atmosphere can't conceal a serious lack of melodic substance."

== Track listing ==
US promotional release
No.	Title	Length
1.	"The Ground Beneath Her Feet"	3:44

UK promotional release
No.	Title	Length
1.	"The Ground Beneath Her Feet"	3:44
2.	"The Million Dollar Hotel Trailer" (video)

== Personnel ==
U2

- Bono – vocals
- The Edge – guitar, piano
- Adam Clayton – bass guitar
- Larry Mullen Jr. – drums, percussion

Additional performers

- Daniel Lanois – pedal steel
- Craig Armstrong – strings
- Leo Pearson – programming
- Danny Saber – programming

Production

- Daniel Lanois – production
- Brian Eno – production
- Richard Rainey – engineering
- Tim Palmer – mixing
- Mark Howard – additional engineering

== Charts ==
=== Weekly charts ===
Chart (2000)	Peak position
Canada Top Singles (RPM)	22
Canada Rock/Alternative (RPM)	2
Iceland (Íslenski Listinn Topp 40)	1
Italy Airplay (Music & Media)	4
US Adult Alternative Airplay (Billboard)	2
US Alternative Airplay (Billboard)	20

=== Year-end charts ===
Chart (2000)	Position
Iceland (Íslenski Listinn Topp 40)	65
US Triple-A (Billboard)	27

== Mnemonic version ==
Members of the London band Mnemonic Richard Das and Jonathan Skipp had heard Bono and the Edge perform a verse of this song as they were writing it for the upcoming film The Million Dollar Hotel on a television program in September 1999 and then interpolated verses and chorus from the Salman Rushdie book The Ground Beneath Her Feet to complete their own version of the song. Band members contributed their parts and a final version was mixed and completed in December 1999.

The band released it free on the internet downloadable from mnemonicgroove.com in January 2000 before the official U2 version (released on 8 February 2000). Hits on the Mnemonic band website at one point peaked at 97,000+ for one day for the download.

The news of their version of the song spread to global news agencies and this was widely reported on various media and a feature on the band was done by The Straits Times. The release of their version of the song as free downloadable media prompted a "surprisingly favourable" response from the Edge.
