= Fun with Dick and Jane (2005 film) =

Comedy film by Dean Parisot

- Theatrical release poster
- Directed by: Dean Parisot
- Screenplay by: Judd Apatow; Nicholas Stoller
- Story by: Judd Apatow; Nicholas Stoller; Gerald Gaiser
- Based on: Fun with Dick and Jane by: David Giler; Jerry Belson; Mordecai Richler; Gerald Gaiser
- Produced by: Brian Grazer; Jim Carrey
- Starring: Jim Carrey; Téa Leoni; Alec Baldwin; Richard Jenkins
- Cinematography: Jerzy Zieliński
- Edited by: Don Zimmerman
- Music by: Theodore Shapiro
- Production companies: Columbia Pictures; Imagine Entertainment; JC 23 Entertainment
- Distributed by: Sony Pictures Releasing
- Release date: December 21, 2005
- Running time: 91 minutes
- Country: United States
- Language: English
- Budget: $100 million
- Box office: $204.7 million

Fun with Dick and Jane (stylized in marketing as Fun with Dick & Jane) is a 2005 American crime screwball comedy film directed by Dean Parisot from a screenplay by Judd Apatow and Nicholas Stoller. A remake of the 1977 film of the same name, the film stars Jim Carrey and Téa Leoni as a married, middle-class couple who, after the husband's employer goes bankrupt, struggle to maintain jobs before eventually resorting to robberies. Alec Baldwin and Richard Jenkins also star, and James Whitmore appears in an uncredited cameo in one of his final roles.

Fun with Dick and Jane was released by Sony Pictures Releasing through its Columbia Pictures label on December 21, 2005, and grossed over $204 million worldwide at the box office. The film received mixed reviews from critics. It was the third collaboration between Carrey and producer Brian Grazer, after Liar Liar (1997) and How the Grinch Stole Christmas (2000).

== Plot ==
In 2000, Dick Harper gets promoted to Vice President of Communications for the major media corporation Globodyne. He convinces his wife Jane to quit her job as a travel agent to spend more time with their son Billy, as Dick's salary would be able to cover their expenses.

However, during an interview on television on his first day, he discovers his CEO covertly sold 80 percent of his shares in the company; just then, Globodyne is accused of "perverting the American dream" by presidential candidate Ralph Nader. Simultaneously, all of the company's stocks drop to zero, the firm is declared bankrupt, and everyone, including Dick, loses their jobs and pensions. Dick tries to confront CEO Jack McCallister, but he smugly dismisses his former employee and flies away in a helicopter.

Breaking the news to his family that night, Dick tries to assure them that he can simply find a new vice president position. However, he soon finds that Globodyne's collapse has sent the overall economy into a recession, dashing any hope of finding a lucrative new position. In addition, the television interview has tarnished his reputation as being incompetent, rendering him unhirable in his field of profession. Even worse, Jane discovers that, because their pension and all their savings and investments were tied up in Globodyne's now-worthless stock, the family now has no assets and can no longer afford their mortgage payments.

Dick and Jane get jobs as a retail associate and a workout instructor, respectively, but Dick is fired for harassing an elderly customer and Jane is dismissed after unintentionally assaulting a client. Their utilities are soon cut off, and the couple have no choice but to pawn their valuables to their maid and take illegal off-the-books employment; this results in Dick being deported to Mexico by federal immigration officers and having to sneak back across the border while Jane suffers a severe allergic reaction while testing makeup. The last straw comes when the bank sends them an eviction notice; Dick turns to crime and persuades his wife to help him.

After a few mishaps, they rob a head shop. They go on to have a few nightly robbing sprees, becoming more comfortable and professional, even stealing from people who wronged them during their job search, and eventually retire their entire debt. For their final heist, they come up with a complex scheme to steal from a local bank. All goes as planned until the Petersons – another Globodyne couple – make an amateurish attempt to rob the same bank. The Petersons are quickly arrested, and Dick and Jane lose their chance to rob the place but take advantage of the hysteria to escape.

Watching a news report on the arrests of the Petersons and other former Globodyne employees who desperately turned to crime, the Harpers decide to cease their criminal lifestyle. However, Dick finds that his interview with Ralph Nader has caused him to be indicted for his unwitting role in the company's collapse. Drowning his sorrows at a millionaire's club, he stumbles upon the drunk former CFO of the company, Frank Bascombe. When he and Jane confront him, Frank remorsefully admits Jack had planned everything from the beginning: during Dick's television interview, Jack diverted all of Globodyne's assets and then dumped the entire stock, thus ruining the company and its employees and investors, and leaving Dick and Frank to take the blame, while embezzling a $400 million fortune and getting off scot-free. Frank, about to go to prison for 18 months for his role in the scheme after failing to expose Jack's crimes, got $10 million in hush money from him.

Frank tells him Jack plans to transfer the $400 million to an offshore account and creates a plan with Dick and Jane to intercept the transfer, rerouting the funds to an account Frank has established. Things go wrong when Dick accidentally loses the form, forcing him to print a new one in the bank while Jack is there making the transfer, with Jane making the switch. Jack realizes there are errors on the form and spots Dick. Finally, Dick holds Jack discreetly at gunpoint, demanding he sign a paltry check, which he does. Dick reveals to Jane it was a ruse to get his signature, so Jane (who studied calligraphy in college) can forge it.

The next day, Jack is mobbed by reporters and former Globodyne employees, all praising him for his sudden "generosity". Dick shows up as vice president and hands him a prepared statement, which the CEO reads on live television. He is shocked to announce he has transferred $400 million to a trust fund to support Globodyne's defunct pension plan. A news report reveals that the company's former employees (including the now-imprisoned Petersons) will get their pension checks from the fund, Dick's reputation is restored for his competent handling of the company's failure, he evades indictment, and Jack's net worth has been reduced to a mere $2,238.04.

Some time later, Dick's family drives a Volkswagen Rabbit convertible into the sunset. While Billy is teaching his parents Spanish, Dick's friend Garth drives up in a brand new Bentley Azure, excited to reveal that he has a new job with great benefits, at Enron, which the Harpers are skeptical of.

== Cast ==
- Jim Carrey as Dick Harper
- Téa Leoni as Jane Harper
- Alec Baldwin as Jack McCallister
- Richard Jenkins as Frank Bascombe
- Angie Harmon as Veronica Cleeman
- John Michael Higgins as Garth
- Richard Burgi as Joe Cleeman
- Carlos Jacott as Oz Peterson
- Stephnie Weir as Debbie Peterson
- David Herman as Angry Caller (voice)
- Aaron Michael Drozin as Billy Harper
- Gloria Garayua as Blanca
- Jason Marsden as Convenience Store Employee
- Clint Howard as INS Agent
- Pasha D. Lychnikoff as Andrei/Load Boxer (uncredited)
- Vincent Curatola as Dick's Neighbor (uncredited)
- Jeff Garlin as Pyramid Tech CEO (uncredited)
- Crystal the Monkey as Test Monkey
- Luis Saguar as Héctor
- Timm Sharp as Jack's Assistant
- Laurie Metcalf as Phyllis (uncredited)
- James Whitmore as Toy Store Security Guard (uncredited) (This was Whitmore's last film before his death 4 years later)
- Ralph Nader as himself
- Kym Whitley as Lucy

== Production ==
Peter Tolan wrote the first draft of the screenplay. In June 2003, it was announced that Jim Carrey would star in the film with Barry Sonnenfeld directing and Brian Grazer producing. On July 14, 2003, it was announced that Cameron Diaz would star opposite Carrey. The same day, it was also reported that the Coen brothers would rewrite the script. On July 3, it was announced that Sonnenfeld had left the film six weeks before the start of production. Production was postponed until after Carrey had completed his next film, Lemony Snicket's A Series of Unfortunate Events (2004).

In October, it was announced that Dean Parisot would replace Sonnenfeld as director and that production would start in June 2004. Judd Apatow and Nicholas Stoller worked on the script with Parisot. Diaz then left the film. On July 21, 2004, it was announced that she would be replaced by Téa Leoni.

The film had more than two weeks of reshoots and numerous rewrites. David Koepp, Ed Solomon, Ted Griffin and the team of Alec Berg, David Mandel and Jeff Schaffer all did uncredited rewrites.

== Soundtrack ==
The score by Theodore Shapiro written for the film was released on January 24, 2006.

Fun with Dick and Jane [Soundtrack]

Soundtrack album by Theodore Shapiro
- Released: January 24, 2006
- Label: Varèse Sarabande

Track listing
| No. | Title | Writer(s) | Length |
|---|---|---|---|
| 1. | "Ameribank Robbery" |
| 2. | "Job Calls" |
| 3. | "Office Chaos" |
| 4. | "Black Jack" |
| 5. | "Main Title" |
| 6. | "51st Floor" |
| 7. | "Jane Quits" |
| 8. | "Quad Slide" |
| 9. | "Race for the Job" |
| 10. | "I.N.S." |
| 11. | "Illegal Immigration" |
| 12. | "Sleeping Beauty" |
| 13. | "Got the Yard Back" |
| 14. | "The Insects Are All Around Us" (Performed by Money Mark) | Mark Ramos Nishita |
| 15. | "Need a Good Wheelman" |
| 16. | "Escape from the Headshop" |
| 17. | "Bank Plan" |
| 18. | "Grand Cayman Bank" |
| 19. | "The Big Stall" |
| 20. | "Gun Pull" |
| 21. | "Starbucks Hit" |
| 22. | "400 Million Dollars" |
| 23. | "End Credits" |

=== Other songs ===
The following songs are featured in the film, but are not included on the soundtrack:

1. "I Believe I Can Fly" - R. Kelly
2. "Smooth Operator" - Sade
3. "Right Place Wrong Time" - Dr. John
4. "What I Got" - Sublime
5. "Sandstorm" - Darude
6. "Why Me Lord" - Johnny Cash
7. "Wedding" - Randy Newman
8. "Time Bomb" - Rancid
9. "Uncontrollable Urge" - Devo
10. "Insane in the Brain" - Cypress Hill
11. "Alive & Amplified" - The Mooney Suzuki
12. "The Best Things in Life Are Free" - Sam Cooke

== Reception ==
=== Box office ===
The film grossed $14 million on its opening weekend in third place when competing with King Kong and The Chronicles of Narnia: The Lion, the Witch and the Wardrobe during the holiday season. It eventually earned $110,332,737 at the domestic box office, and $91,693,375 in international receipts, for a total, worldwide revenue of $202,026,112, against a production budget of $100 million. It is one of twenty feature films to be released in over 3,000 theaters and improve on its box office performance in its second weekend, increasing 14.9% from $14,383,515 to $16,522,532. The high earnings despite the criticism were partially attributed to the scheduled trial of Kenneth Lay and Jeffrey Skilling, and the film credited corporate scandals for inspiration.

=== Critical reaction ===
On Rotten Tomatoes, Fun With Dick and Jane has an approval rating of 30% based on 132 reviews, with an average rating of 4.9/10. The site's critical consensus reads, "This muddled comedy has a few laughs, but never sustains a consistent tone." On Metacritic, the film has a score of 47 out of 100, based on 33 critics, indicating "mixed or average" reviews. Audiences polled by CinemaScore gave the film an average grade of "B" on an A+ to F scale.

Justin Chang of Variety positively described the film as "the rare Hollywood remake that, by daring to reinterpret its source material within a fresh political context, actually has a reason to exist". Manohla Dargis of the New York Times commented that "... the film never settles into a groove, zigging and zagging from belly laughs to pathos ..." Roger Ebert of the Chicago Sun-Times wrote: "Recycles the 1977 comedy right down to repeating the same mistakes." Ebert was critical of the film's unexplored opportunities and wrote that it instead turns to "tired slapstick". He suggested viewers might watch The New Age instead, which he described as a superior film exploring a similar theme.
