= The Ground Beneath Her Feet =

Salman Rushdie's sixth novel

- First edition (UK)
- Author: Salman Rushdie
- Language: English
- Published: April 1999; Jonathan Cape (UK); Henry Holt & Company (US)
- Publication place: United Kingdom
- Media type: Print (hardback & paperback)
- Pages: 592 pp
- ISBN: 0-224-04419-2
- OCLC: 39796091
- Dewey Decimal: 823/.914 21
- LC Class: PR6068.U757 G76 1999
- Preceded by: The Moor's Last Sigh
- Followed by: Fury

The Ground Beneath Her Feet is Salman Rushdie's sixth novel. Published in 1999, it is a variation on the Orpheus/Eurydice myth, with rock music replacing Orpheus's lyre. The myth works as a red thread from which the author sometimes strays, but to which he attaches an endless series of references.

The book, while at its core detailing the love of two men, Ormus Cama and Umeed "Rai" Merchant (the narrator of the story), for the same woman, Vina Apsara, provides a background and alternate history to the entire 1950s–1990s period of the growth of rock music. Defined by Toni Morrison as "a global novel", the book sets itself in the wide frame of Western and post-colonial culture, through the multilingualism of its characters, the mixture of East and West and the great number of references that span from Greek mythology, European philosophy and contemporaries such as Milan Kundera and the stars of rock'n roll.

The title is taken from a song in the novel, composed by Ormus Cama after Vina's death. The lyrics to the song, with minor changes, were adapted and recorded by U2. The song was used in the 2000 film The Million Dollar Hotel, and the promotional music video featured Rushdie in a cameo appearance. Rushdie re-introduces characters from his previous novels, including Homi Catrack and William Methwold from Midnight's Children (1981), S.S. Sisodia from The Satanic Verses (1988), and Aurora Zogoiby from The Moor's Last Sigh (1995), as well as settings such as Warden Road and Everest Villas.

The novel is set in a parallel universe, as revealed in the second half of the book. Thus, there are several historic events that are altered in the setting of the novel. In the novel, American president John F. Kennedy survives the Dallas assassination but is shot alongside his brother Robert F. Kennedy later on; the Watergate scandal is represented as a novel starring a fictional president Richard Nixon. Rushdie also deliberately miscredits some classic rock songs, such as The Rolling Stones' "(I Can't Get No) Satisfaction", which he credits to John Lennon, or Roy Orbison's "Pretty Woman", which he credits to The Kinks. The character named Jesse Garon Parker represents Elvis Presley in every way, while The Who are presented under their original name The High Numbers. In his description of the contribution of Vina's voice to the duet, he compares that of Guinevere Garfunkel to Carly Simon's Bridge over Troubled Waters, where the names of the singers hint at Art Garfunkel and Paul Simon.

== Reception ==
In The Observer, Hermione Lee described the novel as a "very exciting novel, hugely ambitious and original", although she stated that it "isn't without its flaws". In a review for The New York Times, Michiko Kakutani was less favourable, describing the novel as "decidedly disappointing".

== Adaptation ==
The novel has been turned into a major performance work combining music and film that premiered at the inaugural Manchester International Festival in England on 29 June 2007. Composed by Victoria Borisova-Ollas and featuring a film directed by Mike Figgis (Leaving Las Vegas, Internal Affairs), the tale of two star-crossed lovers was performed by the Hallé orchestra, conducted by its music director Mark Elder and Alan Rickman as the narrator, with Tehmina Sunny in the role of Vina.

== See also ==
- Indian English Literature
- Postcolonial Literature
- Hysterical Realism
- Postmodern Literature
