= The Maximum Black EP =

Maximum Black

EP by The Mooney Suzuki
- Released: September 12, 2006
- Recorded: August 1998–January 1999
- Genre: Garage rock, proto-punk
- Length: 28:43
- Label: V2

Professional ratings
Review scores
Source	Rating
Allmusic	4.5/5 stars

The Maximum Black EP is an 11-track album by The Mooney Suzuki. It contains the 6 songs from the original EP and 5 unreleased bonus tracks. Some copies of the album come with a free sticker.

== Track listing ==
1. And Begin 1:30
2. I Say I Love You 1:59
3. My Dear Persephone 2:46
4. Half My Heart 3:47
5. Turn My Blue Sky Black 2:47
6. Love Is A Gentle Whip 2:49
  - These are the 6 original songs
7. Right On 2:36
8. Tell Me Why 2:40
9. This Lonely Land 2:34
10. You're Not There 2:49
11. I Can Only Give You Everything 2:30
  - These are the unreleased tracks
