= Peter Freeman (musician) =

American musician and record producer (1965–2021)

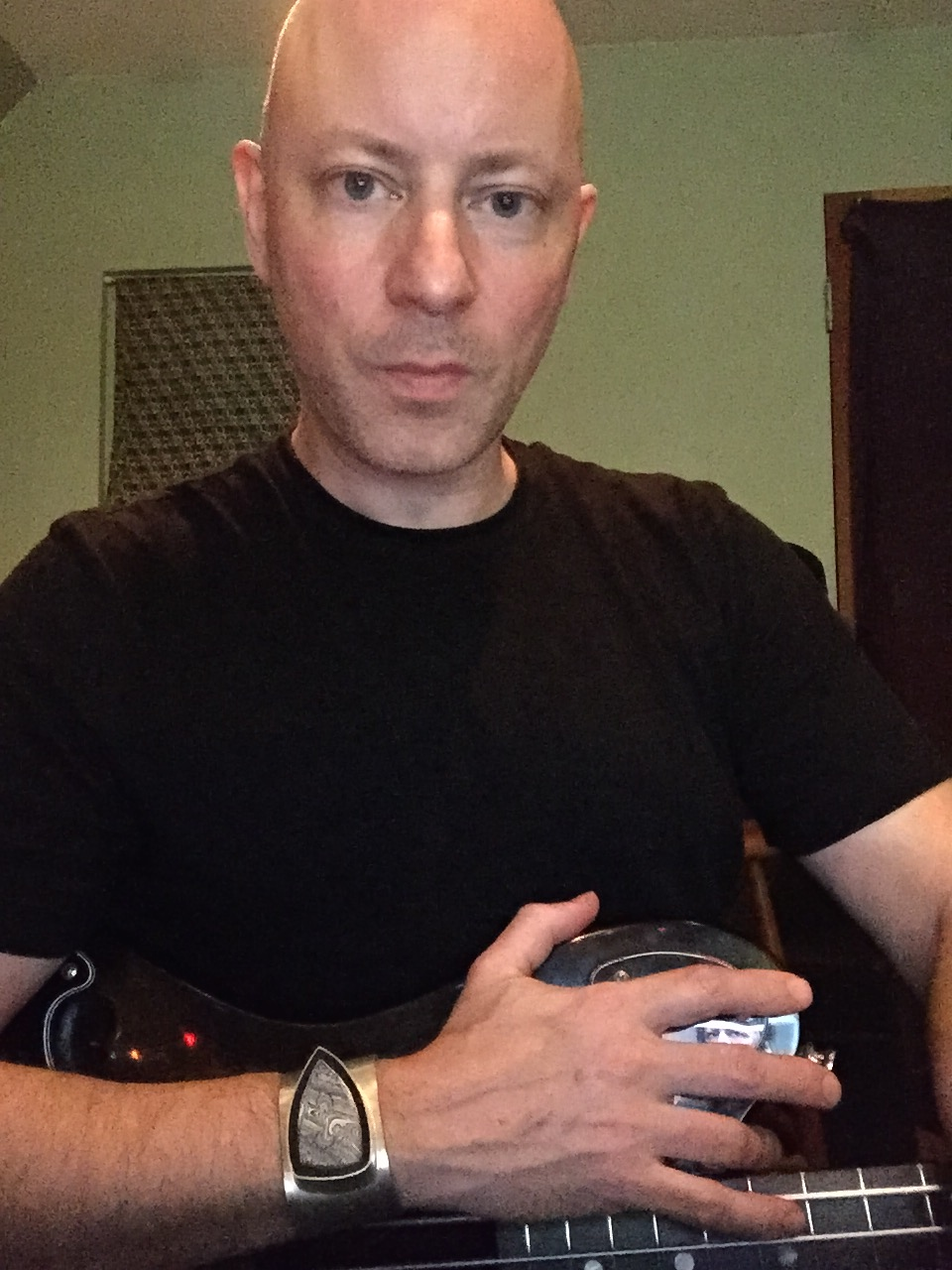
- Freeman in 2015

Background information
- Born: Peter Shapiro; May 29, 1965; New York City, U.S.
- Died: March 16, 2021 (aged 55) Beachwood Canyon, Los Angeles, U.S.
- Genres: Avant-garde; world; ambient; minimalism; electroacoustic
- Instruments: Bass guitar; synthesizer
- Years active: 1983–2021
- Formerly of: Jon Hassell; Alanis Morissette; John Cale; Rick Cox; Seal

Peter Freeman (May 29, 1965 – March 16, 2021) was an American bassist, composer, and record producer. Based in his studio in Los Angeles, he worked on records, live performance, and film and television soundtracks. He was primarily known for his association with avant-garde composer and trumpet-player Jon Hassell. He was also a regular contributor to Electronic Musician during the 80s and 90s.

== Biography ==
Freeman began his professional musical career in 1983 as a bassist with Indian electric violinist L. Shankar. From there, he became involved with mainstream musicians, touring with Seal and Pierce Turner, playing with John Cale, Alanis Morissette, Nile Rodgers, Shawn Colvin, Sussan Deyhim, Elliott Sharp. He was a close musical collaborator with Jon Hassell for over 25 years.

He moved to Los Angeles in 2002, where he branched out into film and television as a musician and musical sound designer working with composers such as Thomas Newman, Cliff Martinez, Anton Sanko, Charlie Clouser, Jeff Rona and others.

He, along with David Zicarelli, had been the driving force behind the iPad music sampling and looping application, Looperverse.

Freeman was a licensed amateur radio operator for over 40 years, and held an Extra Class license. He died on March 16, 2021, after a year-long battle with stomach cancer.

In March 2022, two of Freeman's solo albums were announced by Elliott Sharp and posthumously released on zOaR Records as a digital download and a limited edition double-CD. This was released as a double album, titled K3CS.

== Discography ==
=== Solo works ===
- Mercurial (zOaR Records, 2022) - originally recorded in 2000
- Sinistar (zOaR Records, 2022)

=== Collaborations ===
- The Vertical Collection (Earshot Records, 1997) (with Jon Hassell, as Bluescreen Project)

=== As contributor ===
With Alanis Morissette

- Flavors of Entanglement (Maverick Records, 2008) – bass

With D-Train

- In Your Eyes (Columbia / EMI, 1989) – additional samples

With Hipsway

- Scratch the Surface (Phonogram, 1989) – bass

With Jan Bang

- ...And Poppies From Kandahar (Samadhi Sound, 2010) – bass, electronics

With Jimmy Mbaye

- Dakar Heart (Shanachie, 1994) – bass

With Jon Hassell

- Dressing for Pleasure (Warner Bros., 1994) – bass
- Maarifa Street: Magic Realism Volume Two (Nyen, 2005) – co-producer, bass, percussion, programming, mixing
- Last Night the Moon Came Dropping Its Clothes in the Street (ECM Records, 2009) – co-producer, bass, guitar, samples, percussion, mixing
- Listening to Pictures (Pentimento Volume One) (Ndeya, 2018) – bass
- Seeing Through Sound (Pentimento Volume Two) (Ndeya, 2020) – bass

With Phoebe Legere

- Phoebe Legere (Dead Dog Records, 1993) – bass

With Richard Horowitz and Sussan Deyhim

- Majoun (Sony Classical, 2005) – overtone bass

With Richard Shindell

- Blue Divide (Shanachie, 1994) – synthesizer

With Rick Cox

- Fade (Cold Blue Music, 2005) – co-producer, mixing

With Seal

- Newborn Friend (ZTT, 1994) – bass & appears in the official video
- I'm Alive (ZTT, 1994) – bass

With Shawn Colvin

- Cover Girl (Columbia, 1994) – digital editing

=== As mixing engineer ===
With Erik Sanko

- Past Imperfect, Present Tense (Jetset Records, 2001)

With Veruca Salt

- Lords of Sounds and Lesser Things (Velveteen, 2005)

== Filmography ==
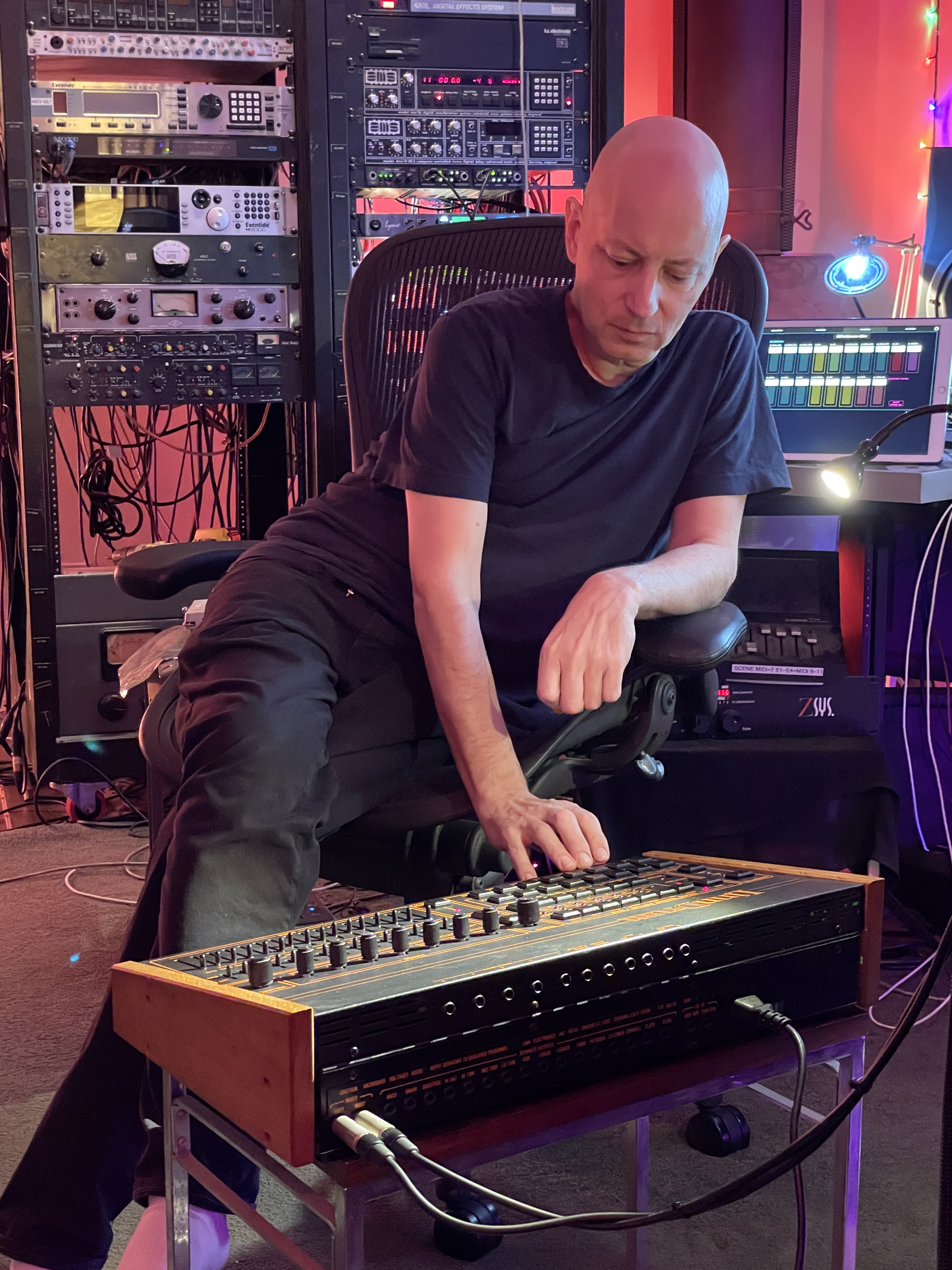
Peter in his studio in 2021, programming a LinnDrum

=== Collaborations ===
- The Deep and Dreamless Sleep (2006) – with Lee Curreri and Jeff Rona

=== As contributor ===
- The Million Dollar Hotel : "Amsterdam Blue (Cortège)" (2000)
- Saw (2004) – bass scrapes
- Traffic (2004) – bass
- Saw II (2005) – musician
- Saw III (2006) – additional score performer / musical sound designer (uncredited)
- Dead Silence (2007) – additional score sound design
- Death Sentence (2007) – musical sound design
- Resident Evil: Extinction (2007) – processed guitars
- Saw IV (2007) – original score performer
- Saw V (2008) – guitar
- Severe Clear (2009) – music programmer
- Saw VI (2009) – guitars
- Saw: The Final Chapter (2010) – guitars
- The Lincoln Lawyer (2011) – guitar
- The Company You Keep (2012) – title sequence drum
- Jessabelle (2014) – additional electronic textures
- Visions (2015) – score mixing
- The Neighbor (2016) – additional music
- The Drowning (2016) – score mixing
- Jigsaw (2017) – weird guitar samples
- Fractured (2019) – processed bass and additional textures
- Spiral: From the Book of Saw (2021) – additional musical sound design

== Television ==
- Alpha House (2013) – score mixing, electric bass, upright bass, guitar
- Big Love (2006) – musical sound design
- Great Migrations (2010) – guitar, bass, programming
- Las Vegas (2003) – guitar, bass, programming
- NUMB3RS (2005) – bass, programming
- The Romanoffs (2018) – score mixing
- Traffic (2004) – musical sound design (uncredited)
