= Earthquake Island (album) =

Studio album by Jon Hassell
- Released: 1978
- Studio: Power Station Studios, N.Y.C.
- Genre: Ambient
- Label: Tomato (Music Works)
- Producer: Jon Hassel

Jon Hassell chronology
Vernal Equinox (1977)	Earthquake Island (1978)	Fourth World, Vol. 1: Possible Musics (1980)

Earthquake Island is a studio album by Jon Hassell, released in 1978 by Tomato (Music Works).

Professional ratings
Review scores
Source	Rating
DownBeat	4/5 stars

== Track listing ==
All music is composed by Jon Hassell.

No.	Title	Length
1.	"Voodoo Wind"	9:29
2.	"Cobra Moon"	4:49
3.	"Sundown Dance"	4:43
4.	"Earthquake Island"	10:07
5.	"Tribal Secret"	3:44
6.	"Balia"	4:32
7.	"Adios Saturn"	1:52

== Personnel ==
Adapted from the Earthquake Island liner notes.

- Jon Hassell – trumpet, Arpstrings, Arp & Polymoog
- Naná Vasconcelos – drums, Tabla, percussion, Voice, cuica, congas, berimbau, handclaps
- Miroslav Vitous – bass
- Claudio Ferreira – guitars, bass
- Ricardo Silveira – guitars
- Badal Roy – tabla
- Dom Um Romao – percussion
- Clarice Taylor – Vocals
- Erasto Vasconcelos – handclaps
- Haroldo Mauro Jr. – handclaps

Production and additional personnel

- Kevin Eggers – executive producer
- Burt Szerlip – Engineer
- Raymond Willhard – Assistant Engineer
- Abdul Mati Klarwein – Cover Art
- Francis Ing/Daniela Morera - Group photo
- Milton Glaser - Album Design
