= Farafina =

Burkinabé music and dance group

Farafina is a music and dance group from Burkina Faso, established in 1978. The eight-member group is Burkina Faso's best known musical group, and one of Africa's most internationally prominent musical groups.

== History ==
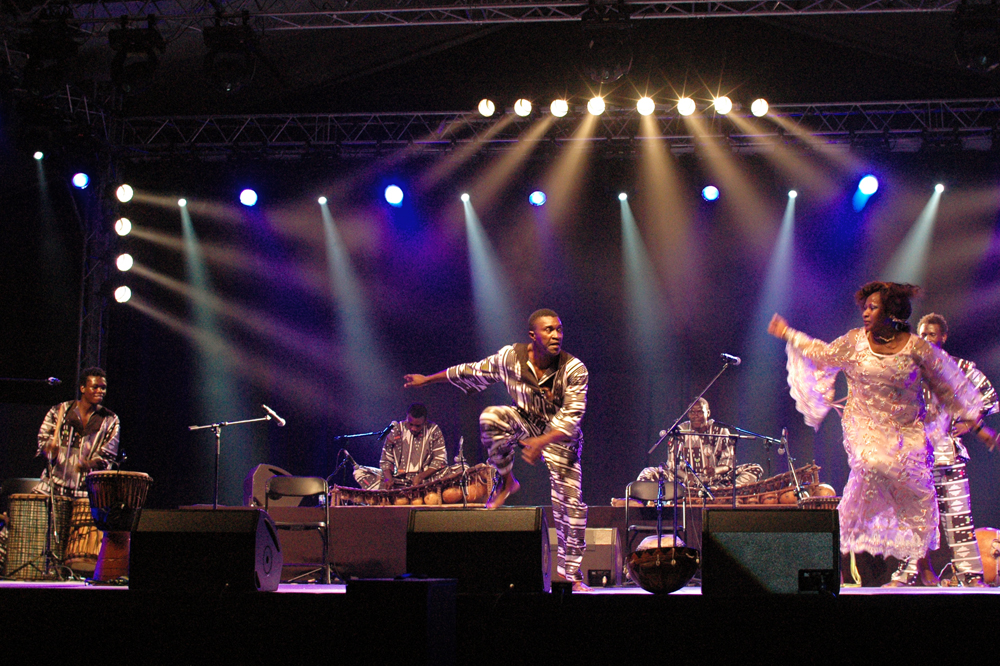
Farafina performing in Warszawa in September 2009.

The group was founded in the southern city of Bobo Dioulasso by the balafon player, Mahama Konaté, a member of the Senufo ethnic group and a performer with Burkina Faso's national ballet. The group mainly uses voices and instruments including the balafon, kora, djembe, bara, tama, [doum'doum), shekere, and keyboard.

The group toured internationally in Europe, Canada, and the United States. In 1985, they played at the Montreux Jazz Festival, and in 1988 performed for thousands at the birthday party of Nelson Mandela in Wembley Stadium, London. In 1993 they toured the United States and Canada. They were one of the groups that played in 1999 during the celebration of the 10th anniversary of the House of World Cultures in Berlin. Later that year, the group played at the Womad Festival in Singapore. The band is planning a 2024 tour, according to their official website.

They have collaborated and recorded with Ryuichi Sakamoto, Jon Hassell, Brian Eno, and The Rolling Stones. The official website of the band announced that Farafina was working on a 2024 tour.

== Discography ==
- 1985 - Farafina Live at Montreux Jazz Festival
- 1989 - Bolomakote
- 1993 - Faso Denou
- 1998 - Nemako
- 2001 - Kanou
- 2012 - Denti Fere

=== With Ryuichi Sakamoto ===
- 1989 - Beauty (three tracks)

=== With The Rolling Stones ===
- 1989 - Steel Wheels (on the track "Continental Drift")

=== With Jon Hassell and Brian Eno ===
- 1988 - Flash of the Spirit
