= The Mooney Suzuki (EP) =

EP by The Mooney Suzuki
- Released: August 1999
- Recorded: August 1998 in Maine, New York; January 1999 at NY HED, New York City, New York
- Genre: Garage rock, indie rock
- Label: Self-released
- Producer: Matt Verta-Ray, Kevin McMahon

The Mooney Suzuki chronology
The Mooney Suzuki (1999)	People Get Ready (2000)

The Mooney Suzuki is the debut extended play (EP) by American garage rock band The Mooney Suzuki.

== Released ==
Released in August 1999, "And Begin", "I Say I Love You" and "My Dear Persephone" were recorded by Matt Verta-Ray at NY HED, New York City in January, 1999; "Half of My Heart", "Turn My Blue Sky Black" and "Love Is a Gentle Whip" were recorded by Kevin McMahon in Maine, New York in August 1998.

== Track listing ==
1. "And Begin" – 1:30
2. "I Say I Love You" – 1:59
3. "My Dear Persephone" – 2:46
4. "Half of My Heart" – 3:47
5. "Turn My Blue Sky Black" – 2:47
6. "Love Is a Gentle Whip" – 2:49

== Personnel ==
The Mooney Suzuki

- Sammy James Jr. – vocals, guitar, design
- Graham Tyler – guitar, design
- John Paul Ribas – bass, design
- Will Rockwell-Scott – drums, design

Additional personnel

- Matt Verta-Ray – production on "And Begin", "I Say I Love You" and "My Dear Persephone"
- Kevin McMahon – production on "Half of My Heart", "Turn My Blue Sky Black" and "Love Is a Gentle Whip"
- Josh Lewis – photography
