= Listening to Pictures =

Studio album by Jon Hassell
- Released: June 8, 2018
- Studio: Studio Venice, California
- Genre: Avant-garde
- Length: 38:41
- Label: Ndeya
- Producer: Jon Hassell

Jon Hassell chronology
Last Night the Moon Came Dropping Its Clothes in the Street (2009)	Listening to Pictures (2018)	Seeing Through Sound (2020)

Professional ratings
Aggregate scores
Source	Rating
Metacritic	84/100
Review scores
Source	Rating
All About Jazz	5/5 stars
Exclaim!	8/10
The Guardian	4/5 stars
The Independent	4/5 stars
Pitchfork	7.3/10
Resident Advisor	4.0/5
Vice (Expert Witness)	A−

Listening to Pictures is a studio album by Jon Hassell. It was released on his own record label, Ndeya, on June 8, 2018. It peaked at number 34 on the UK Dance Albums Chart, as well as number 34 on the UK Independent Albums Chart.

== Critical reception ==
At Metacritic, which assigns a weighted average score out of 100 to reviews from mainstream critics, the album received an average score of 84% based on 10 reviews, indicating "universal acclaim".

John Lewis of The Guardian gave the album 4 stars out of 5, saying, "Hassell's electronic soundscapes recall the work of Oneohtrix Point Never, Boards of Canada or Aphex Twin." He added, "Hassell is into exploring the multiple layers that exist in his sound, what he calls 'vertical listening' – and this is certainly dense, endlessly mutating music that rewards multiple listenings." Dave Beech of The Independent gave the album 4 stars out of 5, saying, "it's not an album that strives for immediacy, but is best soaked in over multiple listens." Robert Ham of Pitchfork gave the album a 7.3 out of 10, saying: "Its eight tracks are teeming with strands of melody and unbound rhythms that have been meticulously constructed into groaning towers of sound."

== Track listing ==
All tracks are written by Jon Hassell.

No.	Title	Length
1.	"Dreaming"	6:08
2.	"Picnic"	5:58
3.	"Slipstream"	2:54
4.	"Al Kongo Udu"	5:12
5.	"Pastorale Vassant"	3:59
6.	"Manga Scene"	5:44
7.	"Her First Rain"	1:38
8.	"Ndeya"	7:06

== Personnel ==
Credits adapted from liner notes.

Musicians

- Jon Hassell – trumpet, keyboards, orchestration
- Rick Cox – guitar, synthesizer, electronics
- John von Seggern – bass guitar, drums, electronics
- Hugh Marsh – electric violin, electronics
- Peter Freeman – bass guitar, electronics (2, 3, 7)
- Ralph Cumbers – drum programming (2)
- Christoph Harbonnier – bass guitar (3)
- Christian Jacob – bass guitar (3)
- Michel Redolfi – electronics (3)
- Eivind Aarset – electric guitar, sampler (8)
- Kheir-Eddine M'Kachiche – violin, sampler (8)

Technical personnel

- Jon Hassell – production
- Rick Cox – co-production
- Matthew Jones – executive production
- Britton Powell – coordination
- Al Carlson – mastering
- Arnaud Mercier – additional mastering
- Valgeir Sigurðsson – additional mastering
- Dan Kuehn – art direction
- Arien Valizadeh – art direction
- Taska Cleveland – art direction
- Mati Klarwein – album art sources, inspiration
- Petra Gehrmann – publishing

== Charts ==
Chart	Peak position
UK Dance Albums (OCC)	34
UK Independent Albums (OCC)	34
