= Last Night the Moon Came Dropping Its Clothes in the Street =

Studio album by Jon Hassell
- Released: February 10, 2009
- Genre: Avant-garde
- Length: 63:48
- Label: ECMECM 2077
- Producer: Manfred Eicher, Jon Hassell

Jon Hassell chronology
Maarifa Street: Magic Realism Volume Two (2005)	Last Night the Moon Came Dropping Its Clothes in the Street (2009)	Listening to Pictures (2018)

Last Night the Moon Came Dropping Its Clothes in the Street is a studio album by Jon Hassell. It was released on ECM on February 10, 2009. The album’s title is taken from the poem “The New Rule” by the Persian Sufi poet Rumi, as translated into English by Coleman Barks.

== Track listing ==
No.	Title	Writer(s)	Length
1.	"Aurora"	Jan Bang; Jon Hassell	5:22
2.	"Time and Place"		3:48
3.	"Abu Gil"		13:04
4.	"Last Night the Moon Came"		11:15
5.	"Clairvoyance"		1:05
6.	"Courtrais"		5:44
7.	"Scintilla"		0:50
8.	"Northline"	Peter Freeman; Hassell	6:43
9.	"Blue Period"		7:58
10.	"Light on Water"		7:59

== Personnel ==
Recorded at Studios La Buisonne, Pernes-le-Fontaines in April 2008. Track 6 recorded live in Courtrais, Belgium. Tracks 3, 8 and 10 recorded live at Kings Place, London, November 2008. Track 9 is a remix of "Amsterdam Blue" that first appeared in Wim Wenders' film "The Million Dollar Hotel".

Credits adapted from liner notes.

Musicians

- Jon Hassell – trumpet, keyboards
- Peter Freeman – bass, laptop
- Jan Bang - live sampling
- Rick Cox – guitar
- Jamie Muhoberac – keyboard, laptop
- Kheir-Eddine M’Kachiche – violin
- Eivind Aarset – guitar
- Helge Norbakken – drum
- Pete Lockett – drums
- Dino J.A. Deane – live sampling

Technical personnel

- Manfred Eicher – production
- Jon Hassell – co-production
- Peter Freeman – co-production, editor, mixing engineer
- Sascha Kleis – design
- Gérald Minkoff – cover photo
