= Aka/Darbari/Java: Magic Realism =

Studio album by Jon Hassell
- Released: 1983
- Recorded: 1982
- Studio: Grant Avenue Studios, Hamilton, Ontario, Canada
- Genre: World, ambient
- Length: 44:10
- Label: Editions EG EGED 31
- Producer: Jon Hassell, Daniel Lanois

Jon Hassell chronology
Dream Theory in Malaya (1981)	Aka/Darbari/Java: Magic Realism (1983)	Power Spot (1986)

Aka/Darbari/Java: Magic Realism is a 1983 album by American trumpet player and composer Jon Hassell, released on the label Editions EG. It was co-produced by Daniel Lanois and features Abdou M'Boup on drums.

== Background ==
The album features Hassell manipulating and looping fragments of sampled sound. In the liner notes, Hassell describes the album as "a proposal for a 'coffee-colored' classical music of the future."

The cover painting is by Mati Klarwein.

== Reception ==
Professional ratings
Review scores
Source	Rating
AllMusic	4/5 stars
The Village Voice	A−

AllMusic's Brian Olewnick described the album as "an insinuating blend of early-'80s high tech with ancient Southeast Asia," calling it "an early high-water mark at the juncture between world and ambient musics." For The Village Voice, Robert Christgau called it "dandy background music--more fluid and organic than Dream Theory in Malaya if also more amorphous than his first Eno collaboration."

In his 1995 book Ocean of Sound, David Toop writes that on Aka/Darbari/Java "the perfume of ethnopoetics was supplemented by parallels with literature and the advanced technology of hyperreality."

== Tracklist ==
All tracks composed by Jon Hassell unless otherwise noted.

1. "Empire I" - 2:00
2. "Empire II" (Hassell, Daniel Lanois) - 4:53
3. "Empire III" - 7:09
4. "Empire IV" - 5:13
5. "Empire V" - 3:40
6. "Darbari Extension I" - 13:52
7. "Darbari Extension II" - 7:23

== Personnel ==
- Jon Hassell - trumpet, keyed voices and instruments, treatments, producer
- Daniel Lanois - recording engineer, mixing and treatments, co-producer
- Abdou M'Boup - drums
- Bob Lanois, Michael Brook, John Forbes - assistance (Toronto)
- Bruno Planet - drum recording engineer (Paris)
- Greg Calbi - mastering
- Jean-Michel Reusser - project coordinator
- Mati Klarwein - artwork
- Paula Greif - design
- Wynn Dan - design assistant
