= Seeing Through Sound =

Studio album by Jon Hassell
- Released: July 24, 2020
- Studios: Studio Venice, California
- Genre: Avant-garde
- Length: 39:00
- Label: Ndeya
- Producers: Jon Hassell, Rick Cox

Jon Hassell chronology
Listening to Pictures (2018)	Seeing Through Sound (2020)

Seeing Through Sound is the eighteenth and final studio album by Jon Hassell. It was released on his own record label, Ndeya, on July 24, 2020 and is a companion piece to his previous release Listening to Pictures. It is the second volume in his Pentimento series.

== Track listing ==
All tracks are written by Jon Hassell.

No.	Title	Length
1.	"Fearless"	8:04
2.	"Moons of Titan"	4:23
3.	"Unknown Wish"	2:53
4.	"Delicado"	4:02
5.	"Reykjavik"	2:16
6.	"Cool Down Coda"	1:41
7.	"Lunar"	6:38
8.	"Timeless"	8:11

== Personnel ==
Credits adapted from album liner notes.

Musicians

- Jon Hassell – trumpet, keyboard electronics
- Rick Cox – electric guitar, bass clarinet, sample orchestration (1, 3, 4, 5, 6, 7)
- Eivind Aarset – electric guitar, sampler (1)
- John von Seggern – electric bass, synth, keyboard samples (1, 3, 4, 6, 8)
- Kheir-Eddine M'Kachiche – violin, sampler (1)
- Michel Redolfi - electronic textures (2)
- Christoph Harbonnier - Lightwave (2)
- Christian Wittman - Lightwave (2)
- Peter Freeman - bass, electric bass (3, 5)
- Hugh Marsh - violin orchestrations, electric violin and orchestration (4, 8)
- Jan Bang - live sampling (5)
- Sam Minae - rhythmized bass samples, percussion (7)
- Adam Rudolph - African drums and orchestration (8)

Technical personnel

- Jon Hassell – production
- Rick Cox – co-production
- Michel Redolfi – co-production (Moons of Titan)
- Matthew Jones – executive production
- Arnaud Mercier – recording engineer / production consultant
- Al Carlson – mastering
- Dan Kuehn – art direction
- Arien Valizadeh – art direction
- Taska Cleveland – art direction
- Mati Klarwein – album art sources, inspiration
