= Maarifa Street: Magic Realism Volume Two =

Maarifa Street (Magic Realism 2)

Live album / studio album by Jon Hassell
- Released: 2005
- Genre: Avant-garde
- Length: 61:56
- Label: Nyen
- Producer: Jon Hassell

Jon Hassell chronology
Fascinoma (1999)	Maarifa Street (Magic Realism 2) (2005)	Last Night the Moon Came Dropping Its Clothes in the Street (2009)

Maarifa Street (Magic Realism 2) is an album by Jon Hassell. It was released on the Nyen label in 2005. The album was recorded live in Milan, Montreal and Paris, with the exception of "New Gods" which was recorded in Game Room Studios, Los Angeles. It was dedicated to the memory of Mati Klarwein.

== Track listing ==
All tracks are written by Jon Hassell, except as noted.

No.	Title	Length
1.	"Divine S.O.S." (Hassell, Peter Freeman)	7:14
2.	"Maarifa Street"	7:08
3.	"Warm Shift"	4:22
4.	"Open Secret (Paris)"	11:47
5.	"New Gods"	7:55
6.	"Darbari Bridge"	11:33
7.	"Open Secret (Milano)"	11:42
Total length:		61:56

== Personnel ==
Credits adapted from liner notes.

Pete Lockett - drums

Musicians

- Jon Hassell – trumpet, keyboards
- Peter Freeman – bass, percussion, programming
- Rick Cox – guitar
- Dhafer Youssef – voice, oud
- John Beasley – keyboards
- Abdou M'boup – drums (original source performance)
- Paolo Fresu – trumpet, effects
- Pete Lockett – drums
- Dino J.A. Deane – live sampling

Technical personnel

- Jon Hassell – production
- Peter Freeman – co-production, mixing engineer
- Jean-Michel Reusser - executive producer
- Scott Hull – mastering
- John Coulthart – design
- Mati Klarwein – artwork
