= Dressing for Pleasure =

Studio album by Jon Hassell
- Released: November 14, 1994
- Genre: Jazz
- Length: 60:42
- Label: Warner Bros.
- Producer: Jon Hassell

Jon Hassell chronology
City: Works of Fiction (1990)	Dressing for Pleasure (1994)	Sulla Strada (1995)

Professional ratings
Review scores
Source	Rating
AllMusic	4/5 stars

Dressing for Pleasure is an album by Jon Hassell that was released by Warner Bros. on November 14, 1994.

== Track listing ==
No.	Title	Writer(s)	Length
1.	"G-Spot"	Jon Hassell	5:03
2.	"Villa Narco"	Jon Hassell	4:32
3.	"Kolo X"	Jon Hassell	3:48
4.	"Personals"	Jon Hassell / Leslie Winer	4:13
5.	"Club Zombie"	Jon Hassell	3:28
6.	"Zeitgeist"	Jon Hassell	3:51
7.	"Steppin’ Thru Time"	Jon Hassell / Pete Scaturro	4:08
8.	"Destination: Bakiff"	Jon Hassell / Juan Tizol	4:16
9.	"Sex Goddess"	Jon Hassell	4:30
10.	"Buzzword"	Jon Hassell / Pete Scaturro / Bryan Mantia / Joe Gore / Buckethead	4:28
11.	"The Gods, They Must Be Crazy"	Jon Hassell / Pete Scaturro	5:42
12.	"Mati"	Jon Hassell	4:21
13.	"Blue Night"	Jon Hassell	7:42
Total length:			60:42

"Destination: Bakiff" contains a sample of "Bakiff" performed by Duke Ellington (cf. The Blanton–Webster Band).

== Personnel ==
Credits adapted from liner notes.

Musicians

- Jon Hassell – trumpet (on all tracks exc. 3, 4, 8), keyboards (tracks 5–9, 12), voice (7, 11)
- Pete Scaturro - Hammond organ (1), piano (2), drum machine (3), keyboard bass (3, 4, 8, 9), electric bass (11)
- Brain - drums, percussion (on all exc. 3, 13)
- Joe Gore - guitar (2, 5, 7–10, 12, 13)
- BLK Lion - keyboard samples, programming (1, 3, 5, 7, 8, 12)

with

- Jamie Muhoberac - synthesizer, keyboard samples (tracks 1, 2, 12)
- Kenny Garrett - saxophone (1, 3)
- Flea - electric bass (1)
- Trevor Dunn - acoustic bass (2, 12)
- Leslie Winer - voice (4)
- DJ Grand Shogun KB - scratches (4)
- Islam Shabazz - electric bass (7, 9), voice (7)
- Lee Curreri - programming, organ treatment (7)
- Gregg Arreguin - guitar (6)
- Buckethead - electric bass (10)
- Zoë Ellis - vocals (11)
- Greg Kurstin - piano (11)
- Peter Freeman – electric bass (13)
- Adam Rudolph - drums, percussion (13)

Technical personnel

- Jon Hassell – production
- Pete Scaturro - production, recording and mixing engineer, additional recording (7)
- Lee Curreri - co-production, recording (7)
- BLK Lion - co-production (7)
- Stephen Marcussen - mastering
- Kevin Laffey - executive producer
- Jon Hassell - art direction, cover design, Bluescreen concept and video still lifes
- Tom Recchion - art direction and cover design
- Katherine Delaney - cover design
- F. Scott Schafer - photography (band)
