= Fourth World, Vol. 1: Possible Musics =

Studio album by Jon Hassell and Brian Eno
- Released: April 1980
- Studio: Celestial Sounds, New York
- Genre: Ambient; world
- Length: 45:05
- Label: Editions EG; Polydor
- Producer: Brian Eno, Jon Hassell

Jon Hassell chronology
Earthquake Island (1978)	Fourth World, Vol. 1: Possible Musics (1980)	Dream Theory in Malaya: Fourth World Volume Two (1981)

Brian Eno chronology
Ambient 2: The Plateaux of Mirror (1980)	Fourth World, Vol. 1: Possible Musics (1980)	Ambient 3: Day of Radiance (1980)

Fourth World, Vol. 1: Possible Musics is an album by Jon Hassell and Brian Eno. It was recorded at Celestial Sounds in New York City and released in 1980 by Editions EG, an imprint label of E.G. Records. "Fourth world music" is a musical aesthetic described by Hassell as "a unified primitive/futuristic sound combining features of world ethnic styles with advanced electronic techniques." The album received praise from many critics.

== Music ==
Hassell's trumpet is the dominant instrument on the whole album.

Handclaps are used as percussion in "Griot", which was recorded live at the Art Gallery of Ontario.

"Rising Thermal" repeats a 4-note, tape-looped trumpet with a heavily treated trumpet over the top that sounds like a human voice. "Charm (Over 'Burundi Cloud')", which took up the whole second side of the original LP release, is based on some of the longer pieces of Hassell's 1977 album "Vernal Equinox" (1). The trumpets feature a reverse echo.

The album's cover photo is a Landsat photo of the area south of Khartoum in Sudan. The map coordinates in "Rising Thermal" ("14°16'N, 32°28'E") translate to the area shown in the photo. The river is the White Nile, which is also the name of a Sudanese state.

Eno took what he learned from making this album and put it to use in his collaboration with David Byrne, My Life in the Bush of Ghosts. Hassell apparently considered that album too "commercial", and castigated Eno in Andy Warhol's Interview magazine for his methods and "lack of musical pedigree". Eventually, they were reconciled.

== Critical reception ==
Professional ratings
Review scores
Source	Rating
AllMusic	5/5 stars
Christgau's Record Guide	A
Exclaim!	10/10
Mojo	4/5 stars
Pitchfork	8.5/10
PopMatters	9/10
Q	3/5 stars
Record Collector	4/5 stars
Spin Alternative Record Guide	8/10
Uncut	8/10

At the end of 1980, Fourth World, Vol. 1 was named one of the year's ten best albums by many critics, including Robert Palmer from The New York Times. Village Voice critic Robert Christgau ranked it sixth on his year-end list for the Pazz & Jop poll. In Christgau's Record Guide: The '80s (1990), he deemed the record "ambient esoteric kitsch" that was "the most seductive (and best) thing Eno's put his name on since Another Green World". Clyde Macfarlane from The Quietus was even more impressed, writing that the album's five "brilliant" recordings channel "some deep psychological urges", "breathe excitement, and are underlined by a heart-pumping, stick-whacking, distinctly human pulse." According to Ann Powers in the Spin Alternative Record Guide (1995), Fourth World, Vol. 1 "pioneered the syncretic approach to world music with which so many artists experimented during the '80s".

== Track listing ==
=== Side one ===
1. "Chemistry" (Jon Hassell, Brian Eno) – 6:50
2. "Delta Rain Dream" (Hassell, Eno) – 3:26
3. "Griot (Over 'Contagious Magic')" (Hassell) – 4:00
4. "Ba-Benzélé" (Hassell) – 6:15
5. "Rising Thermal 14° 16' N; 32° 28' E" (Hassell, Eno) – 3:05

=== Side two ===
1. "Charm (Over 'Burundi Cloud')" (Hassell) – 21:29

== Personnel ==
=== Musicians ===
Individual expressions specific to the album credits are set in italics.

- Jon Hassell – trumpet, Prophet 5 touches on "Delta Rain Dream", "Aluar" loop on "Rising Thermal", ARP loops on "Charm"
- Brian Eno – background cloud guitars on "Delta Rain Dream", Prophet 5 "Starlight" background on "Ba-Benzélé", high altitude Prophet on "Rising Thermal", rare MiniMoog & treatments on "Charm"
- Percy Jones – bass on "Chemistry"
- Naná Vasconcelos – ghatam, congas, loop drum
- Aïyb Dieng – ghatam, congas
- Michael Brook – bass on "Griot"
- Paul Fitzgerald, Gordon Philips, Andrew Timar and Tina Pearson – handclaps on "Griot"
- Jerome Harris – bass on "Ba-Benzélé"
- Night Creatures of Altamira (field recording) on "Rising Thermal"

=== Additional personnel ===
- Michael Jay – engineer
- Peter Sobol – assistant engineer
- Greg Calbi – mastering
- Cream – cover
- William Coupon – Hassell photo
- Roberta Bayley – Eno photo

== Release history ==
Country	Label	Cat. No.	Media	Release date
UK	Editions EG	EGED 7	LP	April 1980
US	Editions EG	EGS 107	LP	April 1980
France	Polydor	2335 207	LP	1980
US	Caroline	1537-2	LP	1980
US	Editions EG	EEGCD 7	CD	1992
US	Plan 9/Caroline	107	CD	1992
Germany	Glitter Beat	GPLP 019	LP/CD	2014

== See also ==
- Dream Theory in Malaya: Fourth World Volume Two
