= The Vertical Collection =

Bluescreen Project: The Vertical Collection (Sketches)

Studio album by Jon Hassell
- Released: February 10, 1997
- Genre: Avant-garde
- Length: 28:42
- Label: Earshot Records
- Producer: Peter Freeman / Jon Hassell

Jon Hassell chronology
| Sulla Strada (1995) | Bluescreen Project: The Vertical Collection (Sketches) (1997) | Fascinoma (1999) |

Bluescreen Project: The Vertical Collection (Sketches) is a studio album by Jon Hassell and Peter Freeman. It was released in France on Earshot Records in November 1997, as a limited edition of 1000 compact discs.

== Track listing ==
All tracks are written by Jon Hassell / Peter Freeman.

| No. | Title | Length |
|---|---|---|
| 1. | "PowerMalay" | 2:40 |
| 2. | "Goddess of…" | 2:00 |
| 3. | "Gift of Passage" | 2:13 |
| 4. | "Gris-Gris/Benzélé" | 3:57 |
| 5. | "Zombie Moiré" | 1:23 |
| 6. | "Dreambass" | 3:25 |
| 7. | "Mystery Gate Ring" | 1:10 |
| 8. | "Lost" | 1:14 |
| 9. | "TychoCity" | 2:40 |
| 10. | "Lontano" | 2:18 |
| 11. | "Reverse Steps" | 1:34 |
| 12. | "Darbari Distortion" | 1:42 |
| 13. | "CitySpot" | 2:02 |
| Total length: | | 28:42 |

== Personnel ==
Credits adapted from liner notes.

Musicians

- Jon Hassell – trumpet, keyboards
- Others

Technical personnel

- Jon Hassell – production
- Peter Freeman – production, mastering, mixing engineer
- Michel Redolfi - executive producer
- Jef Morlan – artwork
- F. Scott Shafer – photography
