= Xalam 2 =

Senegalese musical group

Xalam 2, also known as Xalam and Xalam II, a Senegalese musical group, founded in 1969 by a group of friends. The band was originally called African Khalam Orchestra.

The band takes its name from the xalam, a lute-like instrument. Xalam performed a mix of contemporary jazz tunes as well as African mbalax originals, usually sung in Wolof, the dominant local language; although the leading artists are all Serer and Toucouleur. The band included sax, drums, African percussion, bass and electric guitar.

== History ==
=== Beginnings ===
Xalam started playing dance music, such as rock, salsa, bossa, and rhythm and blues. The group performed in Senegal and other countries in Africa. Numerous musicians have played in the group and through their collaboration, have become popular.

In 1975, they went on an African tour with Hugh Masekela and Miriam Makeba. Later, the group decided it was time to find its own musical identity and left the stage for four years to look for inspiration in traditional folk music and mix it with their own modern music.

In 1979, Xalam made a guest appearance at the Horizonte – Festival der Weltkulturen der Berliner Festspiele. That first trip to Europe was their opportunity to record Ade, their first LP.

=== 1980s ===
In 1981, Xalam recorded music for the soundtrack of the Epcot African Pavilion videotape in Dakar for the Disney Corporation, to be used at their Epcot site in the US. They also performed at the Dakar Jazz Festival and jammed with Dizzy Gillespie, Stan Getz, Sonny Rollins, and others. In the early 1980s, the band moved to Paris, France, where they became regulars on the local music scene. Prosper died in the mid-1980s, replaced on drums by his younger brother, who had been the drummer for Senemali, another Senegalese group which had moved to Amsterdam.

In June 1982, the group was revealed to the French public at Paris Africa Fête. Then, band recorded the following LP, Gorée, in London. The band was so impressive that The Rolling Stones invited the percussionists to play on their next album Undercover of the Night.

A European tour followed in 1983, Xalam opened for Crosby, Stills & Nash in Paris (Hippodrome d'Auteuil). With the release of the LP Gorée, the album reached the Top 5 (African, Reggae, and Folk albums) published in Le Monde for five months.

1984 found the band writing the music for the French movie Marche à l'Ombre (over 5,000,000 spectators), followed by 150 concerts starting in Switzerland and ending in Paris.

Xalam opened for Robert Plant at the Palais des Sports in Paris, France, in 1985.

In 1986, they performed three concerts at the Cirque d'Hiver, then continued on an international tour of more than a hundred gigs to support the release of Apartheid, including the Francofolies of La Rochelle, the Festag in Guadeloupe, and a long winter tour in Africa.

A Canadian tour followed in 1987, including Montreal, Toronto, and Québec. Xalam also performed at the Printemps de Bourges in France and then recorded the LP Xarit in Paris.

In 1988, they played a Parisian concert at The Wiz, a performance at the Paris Africa Fête, then a show in Geneva, Switzerland (in front of 30,000 people), to aid the Helping Hand Cooperation for the N’Dem village in Senegal. The LP Xarit was released, followed by a tour of Austria, Tunisia (Carthage Festival), and Japan (Osaka, Sapporo, Tokyo and Ngoya). Then, they performed at the Anti-Apartheid Night: "Hommage à Nelson Mandela" in Paris, at the Champ de Mars (in front of 25,000 people), and a concert at Montreux Casino.

=== 1990s ===
Between 1989 and 1992, Xalam played various concerts and venues including The Midem in Cannes: concert at the Hotel Martinez, two concerts at the New Morning and La Cigale in Paris; a tour of Africa in 1990, then two concerts at the Auditorium des Halles, Paris; in 1991, a tour of Switzerland and Germany, and back to Switzerland for ten gigs, before recording the next LP Wam Sabindam.

A 1993 French tour warmed up the public for the release of Wam Sabindam in September, followed by a Swiss tour (Arthur’s Club, Emmenthaler Thoune, Le Locle, Chapiteau Sambaille), and another in the spring of 1994 (Case à Chocs, Albani, Bus Stop, Mad, Kantonsschule, Mühle Hunziken). They went to the US that summer, performing at the 25th Anniversary Woodstock Festival (in front of more than 500,000 people), and an English tour, including the Heathrow Festival. After a few shows in 1995 (i.e., Festival in Senegal with RFI (Radio France; the French Cultural Center), the band took a break.

Xalam returned to the stage in 1999 in Switzerland for Le Locle Jazz Festival; a 2001 club tour in Paris, France (Baiser Salé, Petit Journal Montparnasse, etc.); a 2002 European Tour (Belgium, Switzerland, France); a Festival Tour in France in 2003; and a tour of France and Spain in 2004.

=== 2000s to present ===
The band took another break, with some members leaving to pursue various solo projects (i.e., Taffa Cissé composing and playing with Jean-Luc Ponty, for theatrical pieces and clinics; Brahms with Manu Chao, Cheikh producing, composing and arranging with local musicians in Dakar; Henri producing and arranging, as well as managing the Quai des Arts in St. Louis, Senegal; Baye becoming involved planning events at a music center in Saint Germain en Laye, France, while playing with a jazz trio; Souleymane leading a successful solo career in Dakar).

In late 2008 and early 2009, the band made a comeback, with concerts in Dakar, Senegal (Just4You, St. Louis Jazz Festival, Iba Mar Diop Stadium) and Burkina Faso. The reunion tour coincided with the re-release of Apartheid on CD and the first-time release of their live performance, the Montreux Jazz Festival in 1991 (Live à Montreux) on CD, and a Best of two-CD set 2A@Z, on which all tracks were entirely remastered. Xalam was working on a new studio CD, and a DVD release of the 29 April 2009 show at Iba Mar Diop Stadium. They continued to tour, with dates in Lebanon and Johannesburg, South Africa in September/October 2009, and in Dakar, where they worked on new concert dates and projects. In April 2010, the 50th Anniversary of the Independence of Senegal was marked by some special concerts/gala evenings for Xalam in Dakar, Saint-Louis, South Africa and Zimbabwe.

They returned to Paris in 2013 for some shows at Quai Branly and Baiser Salé.

Since then, Xalam has continued to tour and play shows in Africa, and were finally able to release their new CD, Waxati in 2015.

== Discography ==
=== Albums ===
- Daïda (1975)
- Ade (1979)
- Gorée (1983)
- Africa (1984) (cassette-only release in Senegal)
- Apartheid (1986)
- Ndiguël (1987) (cassette-only release in Senegal)
- Xarit (1988)
- Gëstú] (1990)
- Wam Sabindam (1993)
- Live à Montreux (2008)
- 2A@Z (2009) (two-CD Best of, remastered)
- Waxati (2015)
