= The Million Dollar Hotel =

- Theatrical release poster
- Directed by: Wim Wenders
- Screenplay by: Nicholas Klein
- Story by: Bono; Nicholas Klein
- Produced by: Deepak Nayar; Bono; Nicholas Klein; Bruce Davey; Wim Wenders
- Starring: Jeremy Davies; Milla Jovovich; Mel Gibson
- Cinematography: Phedon Papamichael
- Edited by: Tatiana S. Riegel
- Music by: Jon Hassell; Daniel Lanois; Brian Eno
- Production companies: Icon Productions; Road Movies Filmproduktion; Kintop Pictures
- Distributed by: Lions Gate Films (United States); Concorde Filmverleih (Germany); Icon Film Distribution (United Kingdom)
- Release dates: February 9, 2000 (Berlin International Film Festival); February 25, 2000 (American Film Market); February 2, 2001 (United States)
- Running time: 122 minutes
- Countries: United States; Germany; United Kingdom
- Language: English
- Budget: $8 million
- Box office: $6 million

The Million Dollar Hotel is a 2000 drama film based on a concept story by Bono and Nicholas Klein, directed by Wim Wenders, and starring Jeremy Davies, Milla Jovovich, and Mel Gibson. The film features music by U2 and various musicians that was released on the soundtrack, The Million Dollar Hotel: Music from the Motion Picture.

== Plot ==
Izzy (Tim Roth) is found dead outside the dilapidated Million Dollar Hotel in Los Angeles. He appears to have fallen from the hotel's roof. FBI Agent Skinner (Mel Gibson) suspects murder. It quickly becomes clear that the hotel is a haven for social outcasts. Izzy is actually Israel Goldkiss, the son of a wealthy media mogul who instructs Skinner to investigate as discreetly as possible – as he rules out suicide.

The film is told from the perspective of Tom-Tom (Jeremy Davies), an introverted, mildly autistic skater who was friends with Izzy and seems to know more about the events. However, he cleverly hides his psychological quirks. Skinner's unconventional methods attract the attention of Channel 6. Due to a misunderstanding, the "tar paintings" (canvases painted with black tar) of another resident, Geronimo (Jimmy Smits), are mistaken for the deceased's works, which Geronimo then inherits. The other residents see this as their chance to sell the paintings for a high price and thus improve their financial situation. They find an art dealer who senses a lucrative opportunity.

Tom-Tom is in love with Eloise (Milla Jovovich), a part-time prostitute, who initially gives him the cold shoulder. Skinner arranges a night with Eloise for Tom-Tom in exchange for information and eavesdrops on their conversation, which, however, yields no crucial information. To her surprise, Eloise discovers the endearing side of the peculiar Tom-Tom.

Following a coerced tip from Tom-Tom, Skinner has Geronimo arrested as a suspect. The other residents are outraged and see their art business threatened. They persuade the simple-minded Tom-Tom to send a video confession to Channel 6 to exonerate Geronimo, which he agrees to because he enjoys the attention. From then on, he insists on being called only "Tom." At the gala for the unveiling of the paintings, it turns out that among the tar-covered artworks are stolen, valuable paintings that the artist had covered with tar.

In another night with Eloise, during which they dream together of a normal life, Tom reveals that he is indeed responsible for Izzy's death. A flashback shows Izzy's death: he had an affair with Eloise, but only to humiliate her – because Tom's infatuation with Eloise, whom Izzy considered worthless, angered him. Izzy then tried to jump from the roof. Tom initially held him, but, overcome with pain at what Izzy had done to Eloise, let go.

After this flashback, Tom himself takes a running start—as is also seen at the very beginning of the film—and jumps into the abyss before Eloise's eyes, so that his dream of a life with her is not buried by reality. As he falls, he comes to terms with his own life: his only goal had been to restore Eloise to her true self after Izzy's humiliations.

== Cast ==
- Jeremy Davies as Tom Tom
- Milla Jovovich as Eloise
- Mel Gibson as Det. Skinner
- Jimmy Smits as Geronimo
- Peter Stormare as Dixie
- Amanda Plummer as Vivien
- Gloria Stuart as Jessica
- Tom Bower as Hector
- Donal Logue as Det. Charley Best
- Bud Cort as Shorty
- Julian Sands as Terence Scopey
- Conrad Roberts as Stix
- Harris Yulin as Stanley Goldkiss
- Charlayne Woodard as Jean Swift
- Ellen Cleghorne as Marlene
- Richard Edson as Joe
- Tito Larriva as Jesu
- Jon Hassell as Hollow
- Tim Roth (uncredited) as Izzy Goldkiss
- Bono (uncredited) as Man in Hotel Lobby

== Production ==
The story was originally developed by Bono in 1987 when filming the music video for "Where the Streets Have No Name".

== Release ==
=== Critical reception ===
The Million Dollar Hotel received generally negative reviews from critics. It holds a 25% approval rating on Rotten Tomatoes, based on 45 reviews, with an average rating of 4.4/10. It also holds a rating of 25 out of 100 on Metacritic, despite winning the Silver Bear at the Berlin International Film Festival in 2000.

In an October 2000 press conference in Sydney, before the Australian release of the film, Mel Gibson said, "I thought it was as boring as a dog's ass." He later explained:

It was at the end of a day where I had done 6,000 interviews, some guy was ragging on the film and it just slipped out. Later, I thought 'God, why did I say that? I'm an idiot! I produced this film. I'm distributing it!' It was pretty thoughtless of me, because a lot of people worked very hard on that film, and the fact is there are moments of genius in it. The soundtrack is by U2, and it's phenomenal. So I really regret saying that. I have written a lot of apology letters about it.

=== Box office ===
The day after screening at the Berlin Film Festival on February 9, 2000, the film opened on 111 screens in Germany, grossing Deutschemark 620,5444 ($312,617) in its first four days finishing in tenth place at the box office. The film opened in Italy on 225 screens at the end of March 2000 and went on to gross over $6 million there.

It opened in the United States on February 2, 2001 and grossed $29,483 from 10 theatres in its opening weekend and grossed $59,989 in total. It grossed $45,994 in Australia.
