= Alive & Amplified =

Studio album by The Mooney Suzuki
- Released: August 24, 2004
- Recorded: Spring 2004
- Genre: Garage rock
- Length: 40:58
- Label: Columbia
- Producer: The Matrix

The Mooney Suzuki chronology
Electric Sweat (2002)	Alive & Amplified (2004)	Have Mercy (2007)

Professional ratings
Aggregate scores
Source	Rating
Metacritic	51/100
Review scores
Source	Rating
AllMusic	2.5/5 stars
Alternative Press	4/5 stars
Blender	2/5 stars
Entertainment Weekly	C+
Filter	54%
NME	7/10
Mojo	1/5 stars
Pitchfork	5.0/10
Spin	B+
Uncut	4/10

Alive & Amplified is The Mooney Suzuki's third studio album, and their second under Columbia Records. Released on August 24, 2004, it came two years after their second studio album, Electric Sweat. It was recorded in various locations, including Paramount Studios, Ameraycan Studios, and Decoy Studios, all located in Los Angeles, California. Of its content, the band said it is "dense, kaleidoscopic, and that you could spend hours uncovering little nuggets of goodness." Many of the songs assume sexual innuendos, such as "Primitive Condition", "Alive & Amplified", "Shake That Bush Again", "Loose 'n' Juicy", "Messin' in the Dressin' Room", and "Naked Lady". Of the song "New York Girls", Sammy James Jr. said "I love the song California Girls, and the women of New York didn't get a fair shake in California Girls, and he thought the New York Girls needed their fair shake, so we gave that to them."

The title song, "Alive & Amplified", became popular after it was featured in a commercial for the Suzuki Grand Vitara, then in a 2004 episode One Tree Hill, then in the 2005 film Fun with Dick and Jane, and later in video games Madden NFL 2005, ATV Offroad Fury 3, and Shaun White Snowboarding, the 2006 films Bachelor Party Vegas and Grandma's Boy. In 2016, it was the theme tune to Channel 4's TV series The Aliens. "Shake That Bush Again" was featured in Burnout 3: Takedown.

== Artwork ==
The CD liner notes when opened, reveal a full print of the painting Nativity by Mati Klarwein, which depicts a naked woman sitting in a field of psychedelia. On the reverse side, the lyrics and song-specific artwork as well as album credits are present.

The album has an alternative cover, which features the band standing on a beach looking toward the camera as well as using a different design for the album title.

== Critical reception ==
Alive & Amplified was met with "mixed or average" reviews from critics. At Metacritic, which assigns a weighted average rating out of 100 to reviews from mainstream publications, this release received an average score of 51 based on 13 reviews.

== Track listing ==
Alive & Amplified track listing
No.	Title	Writer(s)	Length
1.	"Primitive Condition"	Sammy James Jr.; Graham Tyler	4:18
2.	"Alive & Amplified" (featuring The Matrix)	James Jr.; Tyler; Graham Edwards; Scott Spock; Lauren Christy	3:04
3.	"Legal High" (featuring The Matrix)	James Jr.; Tyler; Edwards; Spock; Christy	2:50
4.	"New York Girls"	James Jr.; Tyler; Edwards; Spock; Christy	3:55
5.	"Shake That Bush Again"	James Jr.; Tyler	3:38
6.	"Sometimes Somethin"	James Jr.; Tyler	4:39
7.	"Loose 'n' Juicy"	James Jr.; Tyler	3:11
8.	"Hot Sugar"	James Jr.; Tyler	3:22
9.	"Messin' in the Dressin' Room"	James Jr.; Tyler	3:47
10.	"Naked Lady"	James Jr.; Tyler	8:05

== Hidden track ==
Find "Love Bus" by fast-forwarding after "Naked Lady". The song starts at 5:13 (approx.) "Love Bus" uses a similar riff to "Legal High."

== Personnel ==
- Sammy James Jr. – lead vocals, rhythm guitar, percussion
- Graham Tyler – lead guitar, vocals, percussion
- Augie Wilson – drum kit, percussion, vocals
- Michael Miles – bass guitar, percussion, vocals
- Mike Finnegan – clavinet on "New York Girls", Hammond organ on "Sometimes Somethin'" and "Naked Lady"
- Lynn Davis – vocals on "Alive & Amplified", "Loose 'n' Juicy", and "Naked Lady"
- The Matrix – additional vocals on "Alive & Amplified"
- Victor Indrizzo – additional percussion
