= People Get Ready (The Mooney Suzuki album) =

Studio album by The Mooney Suzuki
- Released: September 5, 2000
- Recorded: Sweatbox Studio (Austin, Texas)
- Genre: Garage rock; indie rock
- Length: 34:51
- Label: Estrus

The Mooney Suzuki chronology
The Mooney Suzuki (1999)	People Get Ready (2000)	Electric Sweat (2002)

People Get Ready is the debut studio album by American garage rock band The Mooney Suzuki. Recorded at Sweatbox Studio in Austin, Texas, it was released on September 5, 2000, by Estrus Records. The album was later reissued by Estrus in July 2011.

== Recording and production ==
People Get Ready was recorded by Tim Kerr with engineer Mike Vasquez at Sweatbox Studio in Austin, Texas. The band worked with Kerr on the recommendation of Dave Crider, then-head of Estrus Records, who suggested they "just let the tapes roll and see what happens". The album was mastered at Golden Mastering in Ventura, California.

== Promotion and release ==
Following the album's release in September 2000, The Mooney Suzuki embarked on a nationwide tour which lasted over six months; the band claim to have completed "three consecutive laps around the US, often performing two shows a day in each city". The album was later reissued as an LP record by Estrus on July 12, 2011.

== Critical reception ==
Media response to People Get Ready was generally positive. AllMusic writer Jeremy Salmon awarded the album four out of five stars, praising the band's "retro" sound which he compares to that of MC5 and The Stooges. Describing the style of the album as "garagey, proto-punk rock", Salmon concluded that People Get Ready "is an album that ... still can make one excited that music like this is still extant in the world".

== Track listing ==
All tracks are written by The Mooney Suzuki.

No.	Title	Length
1.	"Singin' a Song About Today"	3:20
2.	"Right About Now"	2:55
3.	"Make My Way"	3:33
4.	"Make You Mine"	2:09
5.	"Half of My Heart"	2:43
6.	"Everything's Gone Wrong"	2:45
7.	"I Say I Love You"	2:39
8.	"Do It"	2:11
9.	"My Dear Persephone"	2:01
10.	"Yeah You Can"	3:07
11.	"Oh No"	3:31
12.	"Everytime"	3:57

== Personnel ==
The Mooney Suzuki

- Sammy James, Jr. – vocals, guitar
- Graham Tyler – guitar, vocals
- John Paul Ribas – bass, vocals
- Will Rockwell-Scott – drums

Additional personnel

- Mike Vasquez – engineering
- Tim Kerr – recording
- Art Chantry – design
- Jessica Arp – photography
