= Electric Sweat =

Studio album by The Mooney Suzuki
- Released: April, 2002
- Recorded: August 2001, Ghetto Recorders, Detroit, MI
- Genre: Garage Rock
- Length: 34:34
- Label: Gammon

The Mooney Suzuki chronology
| People Get Ready (2000) | Electric Sweat (2002) | Alive & Amplified (2004) |

Professional ratings
Aggregate scores
| Source | Rating |
|---|---|
| Metacritic | 77/100 |
Review scores
| Source | Rating |
| Allmusic | 4.5/5 stars |

Electric Sweat is the second studio album of The Mooney Suzuki, following on from People Get Ready in 2000. The album was released in April 2002. It was re-released on Columbia Records in 2003.

== Track listing ==
All tracks by Sammy James, Jr.

1. "Electric Sweat" - 3:36
2. "In a Young Man's Mind" - 3:13
3. "Oh Sweet Susanna" - 3:34
4. "A Little Bit of Love" - 2:30
5. "It's Not Easy" - 4:07
6. "Natural Fact" - 3:00
7. "It's Showtime Pt. II" - 3:32
8. "I Woke Up This Mornin'" - 3:44
9. "The Broken Heart" - 5:31
10. "Electrocuted Blues" - 2:48

== Personnel ==
- Michael Bangs – bass
- Jim Diamond – producer, engineer
- Mike Fornatale – cover photo
- John Golden – mastering
- Sammy James Jr. – guitar, vocals
- Todd Osborn – cover photo
- Graham Tyler – guitar
- Will Rockwell-Scott – drums
