= J. A. Deane =

American musician

J. A. Deane was an American musician, performing sometimes on trombone, but more often on synthesizers and live, real-time sampler.

Deane appeared on the pioneering 1985 live recording of Cobra by John Zorn. He has recorded with Jon Hassell, and has performed extensively with Butch Morris. From 1997 to 2013 he led the Out of Context ensemble, which further explored the language of conduction developed by Butch Morris. Out of Context has released CDs on the Zerx and High Mayhem record labels based out of Albuquerque and Santa Fe, New Mexico, respectively.

The following list highlights some of his many music-related activities, is taken predominantly from his Web site, and is neither complete nor detailed:

- Played trombone, alto-flute, clavinet and string synthesizer for Ike and Tina Turner on and around Nutbush City Limits, and for Tina Turner after she and Ike split up.
- Rigged up his trombone with electronics to control analog synths - pre-MIDI – and used tape echo to create a live-looping system.
- Played in the art-punk band Indoor Life, which took him from San Francisco to NYC, which led to him playing samplers and electronics for Jon Hassell.
- With Hassell, started doing something he called "live sampling", possibly coining the term. Appeared on Hassell's landmark album Power Spot.
- Back in San Francisco, played trombone and electronics on three John Zorn albums, with COBRA (Deane played on the second, live disc of the album) gaining the most attention.
- Started playing with Butch Morris in the 1980s – trombone, electronics and sampler – including Morris's touring trio with Wayne Horvitz in 1986 and throughout the European festival circuit 1988–90.
- Moved to Ribera, NM in 1995 and engaged in a new musical community. Releases include NOMAD (Victo), works for dance for his partner, Colleen Mulvihill (Olympic gymnast, choreographer, dancer). Their partnership lasted 38 years, ending with her death in 2019.
- Coproduced a 10-CD boxed set for Morris called Testament (New World). Performed with Morris and Le Quan Ninh (percussionist) at Berlin's 1993 FMP festival, released as Burning Cloud.
- Played lap steel, piano and bass flute in The Bubbadinos, "the world’s worst country band".
- Recorded the definitive version of Steve Peters' Webster Cycles
- Developed sound designs for Sam Shepard (Fool for Love), Theatre Grottesco and many more
- Expanding on a vocabulary of hand signals originated by Butch Morris, led the Out of Context ensemble for 15 years, with members spanning Santa Fe and Albuquerque, NM.
- Worked tirelessly to preserve Morris's legacy and contributions.
- Wrote the book Becoming Music: Conduction and Improvisation as forms of QiGong.

Deane died Friday, 23 July 2021.

== Discography ==
With Jon Hassell

- Power Spot (ECM, 1986)

With Wayne Horvitz

- Miracle Mile (Elektra/Musician, 1992)

With John Zorn

- Cobra (Hathut, 1987)

performs music of Steve Peters

- The Webster Cycles (album) (Cold Blue Music, 2008)
