= Miguel Frasconi =

American composer

Miguel Frasconi (born May 29, 1956 in New York City) is an American composer who often uses improvisation, electronics, and experimental musical instruments.

== Work ==
He has used new glass instruments, and was a founding member of The Glass Orchestra from 1977 to 1986.

He has also worked with John Cage, Jon Hassell, Paul Dresher, John Oswald, and, since 2004, Morton Subotnick.

== Education ==
In 1979, he received his B.F.A. from York University, Toronto, where he studied composition with James Tenney, electronic music with Richard Teitelbaum and David Rosenboom, improvisation with Casey Sokol, and Carnatic music with Jon B. Higgins and Trichy Sankaran.
