= Have Mercy (album) =

Studio album by The Mooney Suzuki
- Released: June 19, 2007
- Recorded: 2006
- Genre: Garage rock
- Length: 46:54
- Label: Elixia Records
- Producers: Kevin Salem, Niko Bolas

The Mooney Suzuki chronology
Alive & Amplified (2004)	Have Mercy (2007)

Professional ratings
Aggregate scores
Source	Rating
Metacritic	47/100
Review scores
Source	Rating
AllMusic	3/5 stars
Alternative Press	3/5 stars
Entertainment Weekly	B
NME	6/10
Pitchfork	3.4/10
PopMatters	4/10
Q	1/5 stars
Rolling Stone	2.5/5 stars
Spin	1/5 stars
Under the Radar	4/10

Have Mercy is an album by American rock band The Mooney Suzuki.

After the band finished touring for Alive & Amplified, they had some troubles. Founder guitarist Graham Tyler's father died, a strong supporter of the band from its early days, and Graham left to tend to his family. Then the rhythm section dropped out. Sammy James Jr., guitarist and singer, wrote many of these songs during the troubled time. When he finally got around to recording them, Graham had rejoined, along with the original drummer, Will Rockwell-Scott.

Current bass player Reno Bo and ex-bass player Michael Bangs are both credited with backing vocals in the liner notes. Ironically, neither of them actually plays bass. Sammy James Jr. covers that.

After all of this, the band eyed an August 2006 release. However, their label V2 Records instead changed it to January 2007 for a better publicity push. Then, V2 folded, and the band spent 5 months looking for a way to release the album. It finally came out in June 2007 with bonus tracks on Elixiia Records/Templar Label Group.

The track '99%' was included on the soundtrack of NHL 08.

The cover art resembles Soft Machine's album Third.

== Track listing ==
1. 99%
2. This Broke Heart of Mine
3. Adam & Eve
4. Ashes
5. Rock 'n' Roller Girl
6. First Comes Love
7. Mercy Me
8. Good Ol' Alcohol
9. The Prime of Life
10. Down But Not Out
11. Leap of Faith (bonus track)
12. You Never Really Wanted To Rock 'n' Roll (bonus track)
13. Caroline (digital bonus track only)
14. Say That You Will (digital bonus track only)
