= Jon Hassell =

American trumpeter (1937–2021)

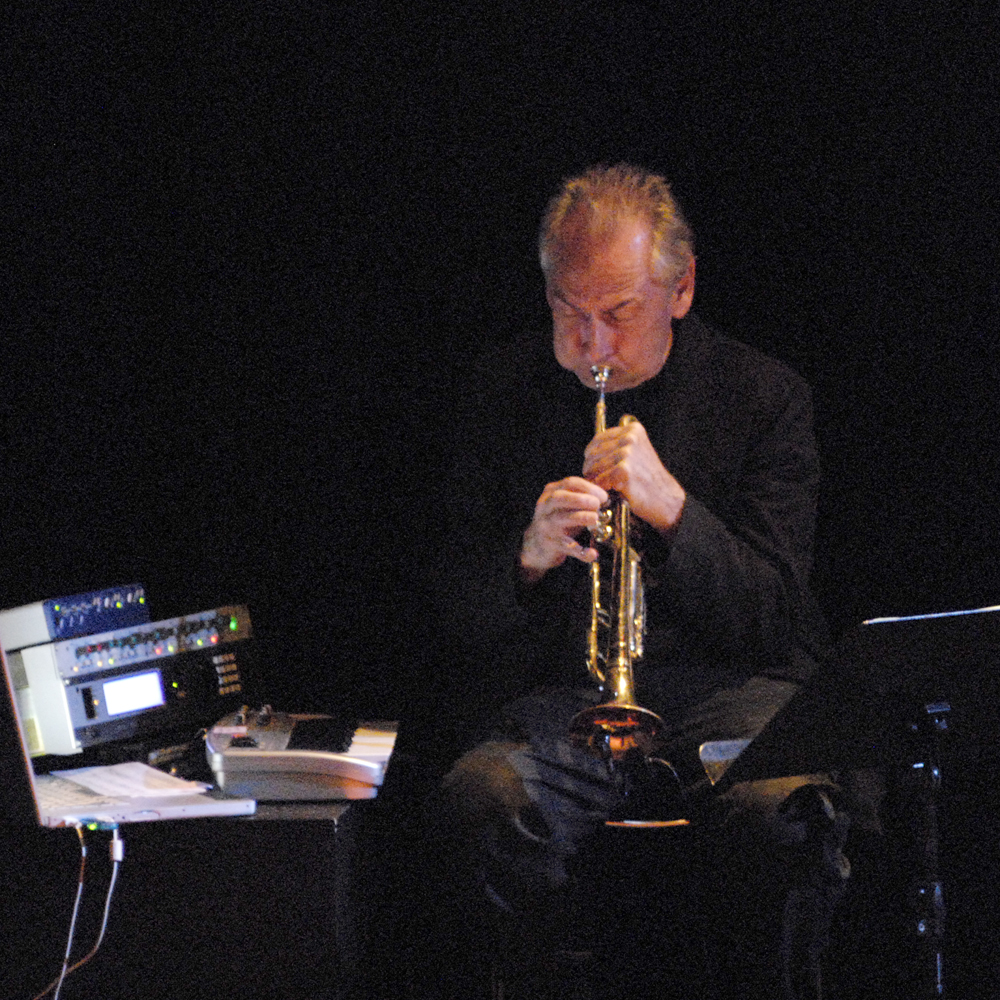
- Jon Hassell at Stockholm JazzFest 2009

Background information
- Born: March 22, 1937; Memphis, Tennessee, U.S.
- Died: June 26, 2021 (aged 84)
- Genres: World; ambient; avant-garde; minimalism; electroacoustic
- Instruments: Trumpet; electronics
- Years active: 1968–2021
- Labels: Editions EG; Intuition; Water Lily Acoustics; Lovely Music; All Saints; Ndeya
- Website: jonhassell.com

Jon Hassell (March 22, 1937 – June 26, 2021) was an American trumpet player and composer. He was best known for developing the concept of "Fourth World" music, which describes a "unified primitive/futurist sound" combining elements of various world ethnic traditions with modern electronic techniques. The concept was first articulated on Fourth World, Vol. 1: Possible Musics, his 1980 collaboration with Brian Eno.

Born in Tennessee, Hassell studied contemporary classical music in New York and later in Germany under composer Karlheinz Stockhausen. He subsequently worked with minimalist composers Terry Riley (on a 1968 recording of In C) and La Monte Young (as part of his Theatre of Eternal Music group), and studied under Hindustani singer Pandit Pran Nath. His association with Brian Eno in the early 1980s would introduce Hassell to a larger audience. He subsequently worked with musical artists such as Talking Heads, David Sylvian, Farafina, Peter Gabriel, Tears for Fears, Ani DiFranco, Techno Animal, Ry Cooder, Moritz von Oswald, and Carl Craig.

== Life and career ==
Born in Memphis, Tennessee, United States, Hassell received his master's degree from the Eastman School of Music in Rochester, New York. During this time he became involved in European serial music, especially the work of Karlheinz Stockhausen, and so after finishing his studies at Eastman, he enrolled in the Cologne Course for New Music (founded and directed by Stockhausen) for two years, where he met Irmin Schmidt and Holger Czukay, who would later go on to form Can. Hassell returned to the U.S. in 1967, where he met Terry Riley in Buffalo, New York, and performed on the first recording of Riley's seminal work In C in 1968. He pursued his Ph.D. in musicology in Buffalo and performed in La Monte Young's Theatre of Eternal Music in New York City, contributing to the 1974 LP Dream House 78′ 17″.

On his return to Buffalo in the early 1970s, Hassell was introduced to the music of Indian Pandit Pran Nath, a specialist in the Kiranic style of singing. Hassell, Young, Marian Zazeela, and Riley went together to India to study with Nath. His work with Nath awoke his appetite for traditional musics of the world, and on the album Vernal Equinox, he used his trumpet (treated with various electronic effects) to imitate the vocal techniques to which Nath had exposed him. He stated:

"From 1973 up until then I was totally immersed in playing raga on the trumpet. I wanted the physical dexterity to be able to come into a room and be able to do something that nobody else in the world could do. My aim was to make a music that was vertically integrated in such a way that at any cross-sectional moment you were not able to pick a single element out as being from a particular country or genre of music."

In 1980, he collaborated with Brian Eno on the album Fourth World, Vol. 1: Possible Musics and appeared on the Eno-produced Talking Heads album Remain in Light. The same year Hassell also performed solo at the Mudd Club. Plans had been made with Eno and David Byrne for the three of them to team up for what became "My Life in the Bush of Ghosts," but the plan fell through when Hassell didn't agree with the direction the tracks were taking. His 1981 release, Dream Theory in Malaya, led to a performance at the first World of Music, Arts and Dance (WOMAD) Festival, organized by Peter Gabriel. He performed and co-wrote tracks on David Sylvian's first solo album Brilliant Trees, and its instrumental EP follow-up Words with the Shaman. In the late 1980s, Hassell contributed to Gabriel's Passion, the soundtrack album for Martin Scorsese's film, The Last Temptation of Christ. Hassell and Pete Scaturro composed the electronic theme music for the television show The Practice. In 1989, Hassell contributed to the Tears for Fears album The Seeds of Love.

In the Spring of 2021, shortly before his passing, Hassell’s final work, “nothing of roselight”/Ndea Records, was released as a 30 minute piece in collaboration with longtime musical partner Rick Cox and Luke Schwartz, composer/ guitarist, known for his experimental work with Glenn Branca and was featured in artist Charles Long’s gallery exhibition, WORKLIGHT, reflecting Hassell’s signature”Fourth World” style, playing continuously through six speaker-sculptures, vibrating sound throughout the space and providing an aural landscape for the installation.

Hassell died from natural causes on June 26, 2021, at the age of 84. He had had health issues over the course of the previous year.

== Style ==
Hassell coined the term "Fourth World" to describe his work on "a unified primitive/futuristic sound combining features of world ethnic styles with advanced electronic techniques." He used extensive electronic processing of his trumpet playing. In addition to nonwestern traditional musics, critics have noted the influence of Miles Davis on Hassell's style, particularly Davis' use of electronics, modal harmony, minimal vibrato and understated lyricism. Both on record and during live performances, Hassell made use of western instruments—keyboards, bass, electric guitar, and percussion—to create modal, hypnotic grooves, over which he often played microtonally-inflected trumpet phrases in the style of Nath's Kiranic vocals. His use of circular breathing on the instrument enabled him to create long, seamless, and mesmerizing melodic lines.

== Discography ==
As leader or co-leader

- Vernal Equinox (Lovely Music, 1977)
- Earthquake Island (Tomato 1978)
- Fourth World, Vol. 1: Possible Musics (Editions EG, 1980), with Brian Eno
- Dream Theory in Malaya: Fourth World Volume Two (Editions EG, 1981)
- Aka/Darbari/Java: Magic Realism (Editions EG, 1983)
- Power Spot (ECM, 1986)
- The Surgeon of the Nightsky Restores Dead Things by the Power of Sound (Intuition, 1987), live recordings
- Flash of the Spirit (Intuition/EMI Electrola, 1988), with Farafina
- City: Works of Fiction (Opal/Warner Bros., 1990; expanded edition on All Saints, 2014)
- Dressing for Pleasure (Warner, 1994), with Bluescreen
- Sulla Strada (Materiali Sonori, 1995), with I Magazzini
- The Vertical Collection (Sketches) (Earshot, 1997), with Peter Freeman as Bluescreen Project
- Fascinoma (Water Lily Acoustics, 1999)
- Hollow Bamboo (Water Lily Acoustics, 2000), with Ry Cooder, Ronu Majumdar and Abhijit Banerjee
- Maarifa Street: Magic Realism Volume Two (Label Bleu, 2005)
- Last Night the Moon Came Dropping Its Clothes in the Street (ECM, 2009)
- Listening to Pictures (Pentimento Volume One) (Ndeya, 2018)
- Seeing Through Sound (Pentimento Volume Two) (Ndeya, 2020)
- Music Is Invisible (Pentimento Volume Three) (Ndeya, 2026)

Single tracks on compilations and remixes

- "Map of Dusk" on compilation Myths 3: La nouvelle serenité (Sub Rosa, 1987), recorded in 1985 with J.A. Deane
- "Pygmy Dance" on compilation Ai Confini / Interzone (New Tone, 1993), recorded live in Italy 1988
- "Streetfaxx" and remixes by 808 State on EP Voiceprint (Blind from the Facts) (Opal, 1990; reissued on All Saints, 1993 and 2006)
- Personals, maxi-single with remixes of "Personals" and "G-Spot" by MC 900 Ft Jesus and Organized Konfusion (Warner, 1994)
- "Then and Now (Berchidda)" on compilation Then and Now (Time in Jazz 1998 | 2007) (Tàjrà It., 2008), live recording from 2001 in Italy with John Beasley, Rick Cox

As sideman and guest appearances

On almost all recordings Jon Hassell played trumpet (sometimes merely 'used' as sound color). In cases where he plays keyboards or electronics it is mentioned in the last column; the same applies to the credits as composer (or producer).
Film soundtracks are labeled "O.S.T." (original sound track) preceding the film title. Artists and labels are linked by first appearance only.

Date	Leading artist or band	Album title	Label	Track titles and notes
1968	Terry Riley	In C	Columbia	ensemble member
1974	Francesco Guccini	Stanze di vita quotidiana	Columbia	ensemble member
1974	La Monte Young and Marian Zazeela	Dream House 78′ 17″	Shandar	ensemble member (quartet) on one of two extensive tracks
1980	Talking Heads	Remain in Light	Sire	on "Houses in Motion"
1982	Brian Eno	Ambient 4: On Land	Editions EG	on "Shadow"
1984	David Sylvian	Brilliant Trees	Virgin	on "Weathered Wall" and "Brilliant Trees", co-composer
1985	David Sylvian	Alchemy: An Index of Possibilities	Virgin	on "Words with the Shaman Part 1–3", co-composer; also released as EP
1985	Peter Gabriel	O.S.T. Birdy	Virgin/Charisma	ensemble member
1987	Lloyd Cole and the Commotions	Mainstream	Polydor	on "Big Snake"
1989	Alice	Il sole nella pioggia	EMI	on "Il sole nella pioggia" and "Le baccanti", pre-sampled trumpet sounds activated by keyboard on "Visioni"
1989	Peter Gabriel	O.S.T. Passion (Music for The Last Temptation of Christ)	Real World/Geffen/Virgin	on "Passion"
1989	Tears for Fears	The Seeds of Love	Fontana	on "Standing on the Corner of the Third World" and "Famous Last Words"
1991	Marc Beacco	The Crocodile Smile	Polydor/Nova	on "Funeral for a Flower", co-composer
1991	Les Nouvelles Polyphonies Corses avec Hector Zazou	Les Nouvelles Polyphonies Corses avec Hector Zazou	Philips/Phonogram	on "Anima", "In la piazza" and "Notte", co-composer
1993	Ry Cooder	O.S.T. Trespass	Sire/Warner	ensemble with Jim Keltner
1994	Stina Nordenstam	And She Closed Her Eyes	Telegram/East West	on "Crime" and "I See You Again"
1995	Techno Animal	Re-Entry	Virgin	on "Flight of the Hermaphrodite" and "Needle Park", co-composer
1996	David Toop	Pink Noir	Virgin	on "Slow Loris Versus Poison Snail", co-composer
1997	Jackson Browne	The Next Voice You Hear: The Best of Jackson Browne	Elektra	on "The Next Voice You Hear" produced by T-Bone Burnett
1997	k.d. lang	Drag	Warner	on "Hain't It Funny?"
1997	Holly Cole	Dark Dear Heart	Alert	on "All the Pretty Little Horses"
1997	Ry Cooder	O.S.T. The End of Violence	Outpost	featured trumpet soloist
1998	Ry Cooder	O.S.T. Primary Colors	Outpost	on "Wide Sky", co-composer
1998	The Insects & Richard Grassby-Lewis featuring Jon Hassell	O.S.T. Love and Death on Long Island	OceanDeep	featured soloist
1998	Mandalay	Empathy	V2	on "It's Enough Now", "This Time Last Year" and "Beautiful"
1998	Ani DiFranco	Little Plastic Castle	Righteous Babe	on (probably one track)
1999	Guy Sigsworth	O.S.T. G:MT – Greenwich Mean Time	Island	on "Who Would You Have Me Love" with Hinda Hicks
1999	David Toop	Hot Pants Idol	Barooni (Nl)	on "Wing Beats", trumpet and harmonizer, co-composer
2000	Hal Willner	O.S.T. The Million Dollar Hotel: Music from the Motion Picture	Interscope	on "Never Let Me Go" and "Amsterdam Blue (Cortege)", co-composer and track production
2000	k.d. lang	Invincible Summer	Warner	on "Simple"
2000	Mandalay	Instinct	V2	on "Not Seventeen", "Don't Invent Me" and "It's Enough Now"
2000	Nick Wood	Sound Virus	Victor (Jp)	on "Confined to Ice"
2001	Ani DiFranco	Revelling/Reckoning	Righteous Babe	on "Revelling"
2001	Howie B.	Folk.	Polydor	on "Tap Dancer", co-composer
2001	Rick Cox	Maria Falling Away	Cold Blue	on "Long Distance", composer
2002	Frou Frou	Details	Island	on "Flicks", "The Dumbing Down of Love" and "Old Piano"
2003	Ibrahim Ferrer	Buenos Hermanos	World Circuit/Nonesuch	on "Fuiste Cruel" and "Boliviana"; album produced by Ry Cooder
2004	Lightwave (with Paul Haslinger)	Bleue comme une orange	Signature	on "Huang/Hong" and "Deep Steel Dubh"
2004	Alexkid	Mint	PIAS	on "Mint", co-composer
2005	Paul Haslinger	O.S.T. Sleeper Cell (TV series)	Rhythmbank	on "Memento Mori" with Sussan Deyhim, co-composer
2005	Ry Cooder	Chávez Ravine	Nonesuch/Perro Verde	on "Don't Call Me Red"
2006	Hadouk Trio	Utopies	Naïve	on last three tracks, co-composer
2007	Paul Haslinger	O.S.T. Sleeper Cell: American Terror	Lakeshore	(not specified)
2007	Ry Cooder	My Name Is Buddy	Nonesuch/Perro Verde	on "One Cat, One Vote, One Beer"
2007	Harry Gregson-Williams	O.S.T. The Number 23	New Line	featured as soloist
2007	Michael Fahres	The Tubes	Cold Blue	on "The Tubes (1994/2003)" with Mark Atkins
2008	Jan Bang and Erik Honoré as Punkt	Live Remixes Vol. 1	Jazzland	on tracks "III" and "VI", co-composer
2008	Ani DiFranco	Red Letter Year	Righteous Babe	on "Star Matter"
2008	k.d. lang	Watershed	Nonesuch	on "Upstream"
2008	Ry Cooder	I, Flathead	Nonesuch/Perro Verde	on "Flathead One More Time"
2009	Jon Balke & Amina Alaoui	Siwan	ECM	ensemble member, trumpet and electronics
2010	Jan Bang	…And Poppies from Kandahar	Samadhisound	on "Exile from Paradise", co-composer (also for another track, due to trumpet samples)
2011	Paul Haslinger	O.S.T Underworld: Rise of the Lycans	Lakeshore	featured musician
2015	Bassekou Kouyaté & Ngoni Ba	Ba Power	Glitterbeat (G)	on "Ayé Sira Bla = Make Way"
2015	Duncan Sheik	Legerdemain	Kobalt	on "Brutalized" and "No Happy End"
2016	Genre Peak (Martin Birke)	Your Sleekest Engine	Gonzo	on "Metanoia", trumpet samples and/or sampler

== See also ==
- David Sylvian
- Erik Truffaz
- Erik Honoré
- List of ambient music artists
- Michael Brook
- Talking Heads

== Bibliography ==
- Mark Prendergast, The Ambient Century. New York and London, Bloomsbury Publishing, 2000, ISBN 978-0747557326
- Jon Hassell, program notes from Vernal Equinox. Lovely Music, LML 1021, 1977.
