= The Mooney Suzuki =

American garage rock band

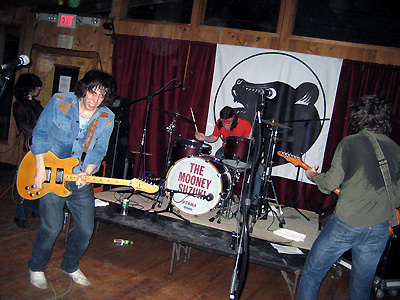

Background information
- Origin: New York City, New York, U.S.
- Genres: Garage rock; garage rock revival; indie rock
- Years active: 1996–2000; 2001–2008 (on hiatus)
- Labels: Sonic Unyon; Estrus; Telstar; Gammon; Columbia; Cass; V2; Elixia
- Members: Sammy James Jr.; Will Rockwell-Scott; Chris Isom; Reno Bo
- Past members: Graham Tyler; John Paul Ribas; Augie Wilson; Marc-Phillipe Eskenazi
- Website: www.themooneysuzuki.com

The Mooney Suzuki is an American garage rock band that formed in New York City in 1996. Originally comprising vocalist and guitarist Sammy James Jr., guitarist Graham Tyler, bassist John Paul Ribas and drummer Will Rockwell-Scott, the band has released four studio albums – People Get Ready (2000), Electric Sweat (2003), Alive & Amplified (2004) and Have Mercy (2007). The current lineup includes founding members James and Rockwell-Scott, guitarist Chris Isom, and bassist Reno Bo.

== History ==
The band formed in 1996, after Graham Tyler responded to an ad that former 2 Skinnee J's guitarist, Sammy James Jr., posted in a guitar store. They released their first two singles, "Taking Me Apart" and "Love Is Everywhere", in 1998. The band takes its name from two lead singers for the band Can, Malcolm Mooney and Damo Suzuki.

The band came out with their first EP in 1999, followed by their first album, People Get Ready, in 2000 on the Estruslabel. In early 2002, the band won the New York Regional Poll in The 1st Annual Independent Music Awards for "My Dear Persephone" They broke up shortly afterwards, but soon reunited at the behest of The Donnas. After shows with The White Stripes and The Greenhornes, the band decided to record another record with Jim Diamond. Electric Sweat came out in 2002 and the band toured with longtime friends the Strokes and Swedish garage rockers the Hives. This tour led to their signing with Columbia Records, followed by appearances on Late Night with Conan O'Brien, The Late Late Show with Craig Kilborn, and Friday Night with Jonathan Ross. During this time, Sammy James Jr. penned the title track in the Jack Black movie School of Rock. He also wrote the closing theme "Tread Lightly Rosie Grier."

In 2003, at Lollapalooza, the band began playing new songs such as "Primitive Condition", which would appear on the Matrix-produced album, Alive and Amplified. The title song became the band's biggest hit, appearing in the Madden NFL 2005, Shaun White Snowboarding, and ATV Offroad Fury 3 video game soundtracks. "Alive and Amplified" broke into the UK Singles Chart at No. 38, and appeared in the 2005 remake of Fun with Dick and Jane, as well as the 2006 film Grandma's Boy. They also contributed to the Burnout 3 soundtrack with another single from that album, "Shake that Bush Again". Soon the band toured with Kings of Leon.

The band traded labels for V2 Records in 2005. The band's album Have Mercy was to have been released on V2 Records in summer 2007 (originally set for January 2007, and then spring, according to V2 marketing materials). Due to the reorganization of V2 announced in January 2007, the album was not released on that label, but instead came out on June 19 on indie label Elixia Records.

In 2007, the band recorded a cover version of Cher's "Just Like Jesse James" for Engine Room Recordings' compilation album Guilt by Association, which appeared in September 2007. Around this time, they also recorded the "spring soundtrack" for DKNY jeans. In 2008 the band recorded their fifth album and made a cameo appearance in Ben Stiller's film Tropic Thunder, in addition to contributing covers of "I Just Want to Celebrate" and "All Along the Watchtower" to the film's soundtrack. James Jr. mentored a young rocker for an episode of the award-winning MTV series Made.

In April 2019 it was announced the band would play the Mercury Lounge on July 19 as part of the venue's 25th anniversary celebrations. The show sold out immediately. In May, a second show was added for July 20.

== Side projects ==
Guitarist Chris Isom formed a band, Loud Owls, while bassist Reno Bo played bass with Albert Hammond, Jr., putting his solo album on hold. Sammy James Jr. played New York City with bands such as The Pierces, Men Without Pants and Native Korean Rock, featuring Russell Simins of Jon Spencer Blues Explosion and Karen O of the Yeah Yeah Yeahs. From April 2010 to February 2012, Will Rockwell-Scott was the drummer for Australian rock band Wolfmother. That same year, Mooney Suzuki's song "Do It" was used for a commercial by SAP AG.

== Trivia ==
- A level (84-2) in version 1.4 of the video game N is named after the band.
- The band’s name combines the last names of the first two vocalists of the German band Can, Malcolm Mooney and Damo Suzuki.

== Discography ==
Studio albums

- People Get Ready (2000)
- Electric Sweat (2002)
- Alive & Amplified (2004)
- Have Mercy (2007)

== Members ==
Notable past members include Nikolai Fraiture of the Strokes and the Strokes' manager, Ryan Gentles, Jay Braun of the Negatones, Steven Mertens of Adam Green and the Moldy Peaches, Carson Bell of The Pattern, and Marc-Phillipe Eskenazi of Albert Hammond, Jr.

Original member Graham Tyler left the band to become a graphic designer, as did Augie Wilson, drummer on Alive & Amplified, upon graduating from Cooper Union. The current lineup includes guitarist Chris Isom, who has played with members of The Fiery Furnaces and The Negatones, as well as bass player Reno Bo, who contributes to Albert Hammond, Jr. and The Fame. Drummer Will Rockwell-Scott rejoined the band for their Have Mercy tour after leaving upon the completion of Electric Sweat. Rockwell-Scott has also played drums for New York City-based quintet Apes & Androids.
