= Peter Gric =

Austrian painter, drawer and illustrator

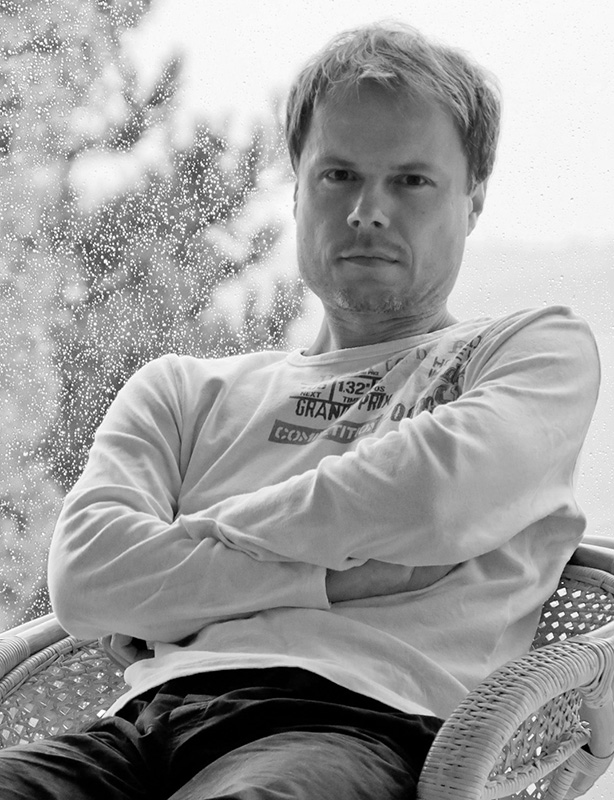
- Born: Petr Gric; 1968 (age 57–58); Brno, Czechoslovakia
- Education: Academy of Fine Arts Vienna
- Known for: painting, drawing
- Movement: Surrealism
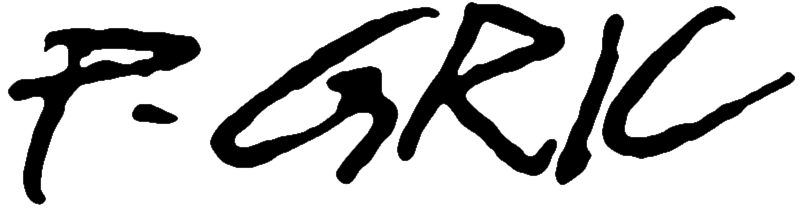
- Website: gric.at

Peter Gric, or Petr Gric, (born 1968) is an Austrian painter, drawer, and illustrator originally from the Czech Republic. Motifs of futuristic landscapes and architecture, biomechanical surrealism, and fantastic realism can be found in his work. Gric is a member of the art groups Libellule and Labyrinthe.

== Life ==
Petr Gric was born in 1968 in Brno, former Czechoslovakia. His parents supported his talent in painting and drawing, which he exhibited when he was young. In 1980 his parents, under the pretense described as vacation travel, emigrated through Hungary and Yugoslavia to Austria, and Gric thenceforth lived in Western Europe. They spent one year in the countryside of Reichenau an der Rax. They soon moved to Linz where Gric finished primary school and studied graphic design at the Höhere Technische Lehranstalt. In 1988 he moved to Vienna where he began to study under Arik Brauer at the Academy of Fine Arts Vienna. He finished his studies with a Master of Fine Arts degree in 1993. While still in college, he participated in several exhibitions and started to sell his work successfully. In 1996, Gric presented his work about the connection of painting and computer graphics at the Academy of Fine Arts Vienna.

In 2009, he moved from Vienna to Höflein an der Hohen Wand.

== Work ==
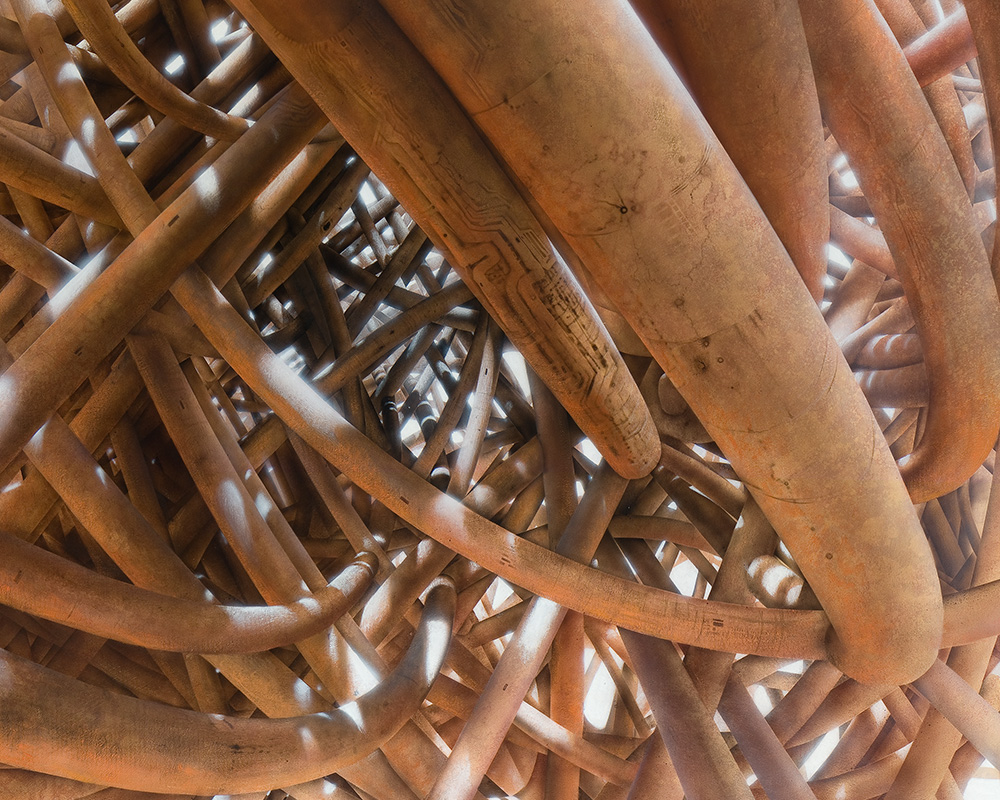
Painting Network IV (fragment), acrylic on canvas

Working as an artist for a living, he creates new works irregularly. Prior to exhibiting, he works tirelessly, but often without producing anything for weeks, only experimenting with graphic software and geometry for his new work. Smaller format works take him a few days or weeks to complete. Large works take him months to complete. However, many of them have been in the works for a long time and will not be completed for several years. Some of his works are several meters in size.

=== Techniques ===
Gric uses oil paint, acrylic paint, or combinations thereof. He also uses airbrushes. Most of his work he designs in graphic software and the more complex pieces, he models in 3D software. Despite his work in computer graphics, it is not his primary medium.

=== Motifs ===
His art is a combination of futuristic landscapes and architecture, biomechanical surrealism and fantastic realism. Before his artistic career, he was influenced by science fiction illustrators Chris Moore, Peter Elson and by Star Wars movies. However, his biggest influence was surrealistic paintings by his father, and artists like Salvador Dalí, Giorgio de Chirico, Max Ernst, Ernst Fuchs, Rudolf Hausner, Samuel Bak, Alfred Kubin, Hans Ruedi Giger and later Zdzisław Beksiński, Odd Nerdrum and De Es Schwertberger. Most of his inspirations are from nature and architecture, but he is also fascinated by erosion, abstract geometry and women's bodies. Gric creates visions and fantasy that he himself can't explain. Like Beksiński, he doesn't care about interpretations of his works.

Gric declared about his art:

I find it hard to explain what I’m painting, or why; actually, I don’t see any reason to analyse or justify my work. However, I like enigmas – they seem so boundless as long as they are unsolved.

== Exhibitions and collaboration ==
In 2007, he participated in the design of the stage for the SamPlay production Hamlet in Rock. In 2010, he worked on the Concept Design for the project "At the Mountains of Madness" by director Guillermo del Toro. From 2011 to 2015, Gric was teaching at the Academy of Fine Arts Vienna.

Many of Gric's works are in personal or public collections: Austrian state gallery Belvedere; Immuno AG; Municipal Gallery in Traun; Kunstlerhaus München; Art Visionary Collection in Melbourne; Rardy van Soest Collection in Houten, Netherlands; Trierenberg Art in Traun; beinArt Collection, Australia; Westermann Collection, Germany.

== Publications ==
- 1990 - Meisterschule Brauer - Oberes Belvedere '90 (Hubert Adolph, Arik Brauer, Regine Schmidt) (Austrian Gallery Belvedere (palace), Vienna)
- 1993 - Peter Gric - Katalog (Dalibor Truhlar) (Edition Lyra) ISBN 3-901431-03-9
- 1993 - Akademie der bildenden Künste - Diplomarbeiten 1993 (Carl Pruscha) (Academy of Fine Arts, Vienna)
- 1994 - Kick off () (Academy of Fine Arts, Vienna)
- 1997 - Vier Meisterschulen für Malerei der Akademie der bildenden Künste Wien (Dr. Heinz Fischer, Elisabeth v. Samsonow, Arik Brauer) (Academy of Fine Arts, Vienna)
- 2000 - Phantastik am Ende der Zeit (Thomas Engelhardt, Christine Ivanovic) (Town Museum Erlangen) ISBN 3-930035-03-0
- 2000 - gegen-stand - Projekt Donauauen (Wilhelm Molterer, Dr.Bernd Lötsch) (Naturhistorisches Museum / Museum of Natural History, Vienna)
- 2001 - ARSFANTASTICA - Die Sammlung bei der Ernst Fuchs Pate stand (Hubert Klocker, Gerhard Habarta, Milan Vukovich) (ISMAEL.cc)
- 2004 - Trierenberg Art - Kunst im Werk (Christian Trierenberg, Dr. Christian Hinterobermaier) (Trierenberg Holding AG)
- 2004 - The illustrated to think like God : Pythagoras and Parmenides : the origins of philosophy (Arnold Hermann) (Parmenides Publishing) ISBN 1-930972-17-2
- 2007 - Metamorphosis (beinArt) ISBN 978-0-9803231-0-8
- 2007 - L’ange exquis: Être Ange, Étrange (Libellule Ltd.)
