= List of works by De Es Schwertberger =

This article is a list of work by De Es Schwertberger (born 1942), an Austrian artist, painter, and modeller.

De Es Schwertberger's works have been exhibited in the following one-person exhibits, group shows, and portfolios:

== Galleries and exhibits ==
=== 1960s ===
- Galerie Ernst Fuchs in Vienna, Austria (1963)
- Galerie Ernst Fuchs in Vienna, Austria (1965)

=== 1970s ===
- Galerie Bernard in Solothurn, Switzerland (1970)
- Galerie Aurora in Geneva, Switzerland (1970)
- Galerie Hartmann in Munich, Germany (1970)
- Aktions Galerie in Bern, Switzerland (with H.R. Giger) (1971)
- Galerie Palette in Zürich, Switzerland (1971)
- Galerie Herzog in Büren, Switzerland (1971)
- Aktions Galerie in Bern, Switzerland (1972)
- Galeria La Lanterna in Trieste, Italy (1973)
- Künstlerhaus Galerie in Vienna, Austria (1974)
- Galerie Spektrum in Vienna, Austria (1974)
- Galerie Akademia in Salzburg, Austria (1974)
- Galerie Jasa in Munich, Germany (1974)
- Center on Art and Communication in Vienna, Austria (1974)
- Hansen Gallery in New York City, USA (1975)
- James Yu Gallery in New York City, USA (1976)
- Aldrich Museum in Connecticut, USA (1976)
- Graham Gallery in New York City, USA (1977)
- Gallery Yolonda in Chicago, USA (1978)
- Hansen Gallery in New York City, USA (1979)
- Quantum Gallery in New York City, USA (1979)

=== 1980s ===
- Hansen Gallery in New York City, USA (1980)
- Virtu Gallery in Naples, Florida (1980)
- Bronx Museum in New York City, USA (1980)
- Art Expo in New York City, USA (1981)
- Marshall Fields Gallery in Chicago, USA (1981)
- Govinda Gallery in Washington, DC USA (1981)
- Art Expo in New York City, USA (1982)
- Graham Gallery in New York City, USA (New York Visionaries) (1982)
- Museum of the Visual Arts in New York City, USA (1983)
- Austrian Artists at the International Monetary Fund in Washington, DC, USA (1984)
- Studio Planet Earth in New York City, USA (1980-1986)
- Galerie Würthle in the Sinnreich, Austria (1987)
- Galerie Steinmühle near Linz, Austria (1988)
- Sammlung Ludwig Neue Galerie in Aachen, Germany (1988)

=== 1990s ===
- Opel Fine Art in Vienna, Austria (1990)
- Gathering of Forty Planetarians in Bern, Switzerland (1991)
- Kreuzwegstation im Sinnreich, Austria (1993)
- The skin of the earth, at the Künstlerhaus Gallery in Vienna, Austria (1995)
- Exhibition in Frauenbad, Baden (1997)
- Sinnlicher Somme, Künstlerhaus Galerie in Vienna, Austria (1997)
- Wieder Sehen, Gallery Lang (1997)
- Kuenburg Payerbach, in Austria (1998)
- Retrospective, at the Chateau Gruyeres, Switzerland (1998)
- Centre for Documentation, St. Pölten (1999)
- Planetarians at the Vienna City Festival (1999)

=== 2000s ===
- 100 Planetarians at the Himmelswiese, Vienna (2000)
- Exhibition of Planetarians in Graz, Austria (2000-2001)
- Planetarians on vacation at Velden (2001)
- Exhibition of Planetarians in St. Peter an der Sperr, Wr. Neustadt (2001)
- Patterns of the city Gallery Akum in Vienna, Austria (2002)
- Gleichnis, Künstlerhaus, Vienna (2003)

== Portfolios ==
=== Early work (the 1960s) ===
- Ideas of Truth, early 1960s. Based on the work of the Old Masters
- The Missing Weapon, 1968. Etchings
- Ideas of consciousness-expansion, 1960s and early 1970s.

=== Later development( the 1970s) ===
- Stone Period, 1970s.
- Work for Fundamental Images, early 1970s.
- Contemplations of the Spirit-Matter Mystery, late 1970s. Work revolves around his Stone Period style art

=== The 1980s ===
- The Cosmic Dance and the Light of Life, 1980s (completed 1989).
- Planetarians, mid-to-late 1980s.

=== The 1990s ===
- Planetarian Sculptures, 1990–1992. Exhibitions of 'Planetarian' sculptures.
- Humanity is One, Early to mid 1990s.

== Books/publications ==
=== Books ===
- 1972: Fundamentale Bilder (Fundamental Images)
- 1982: Sharing Light
- 1984: Philosophers Stone (a deck of 40 cards, for Sphinx Verlag)
- 1992: Heavy Light (Published by Morpheus International)

=== Articles ===
- Omni Magazine
- Heavy Metal Magazine
- Triad Magazine
- Avant Garde Magazine
- Bres Magazine
- Arts Magazine
- L'Art Visionaire (Michel Random)
- The Viennese School of Fantastic Realism (Muschik)

== See also ==
- De Es Schwertberger, the life of the artist
- Old Masters, on whose work he based his initial art
- Ernst Fuchs (artist), his tutor and early inspiration
- Fantastic Realism, school of art

== External links/sources ==
- De Es' Website, shows his work and a chronology of his projects
- Dome of Peace, shows his work and future project (The 'Dome of Peace')
