= Helmut Leherb =

Austrian painter (1933–1997)

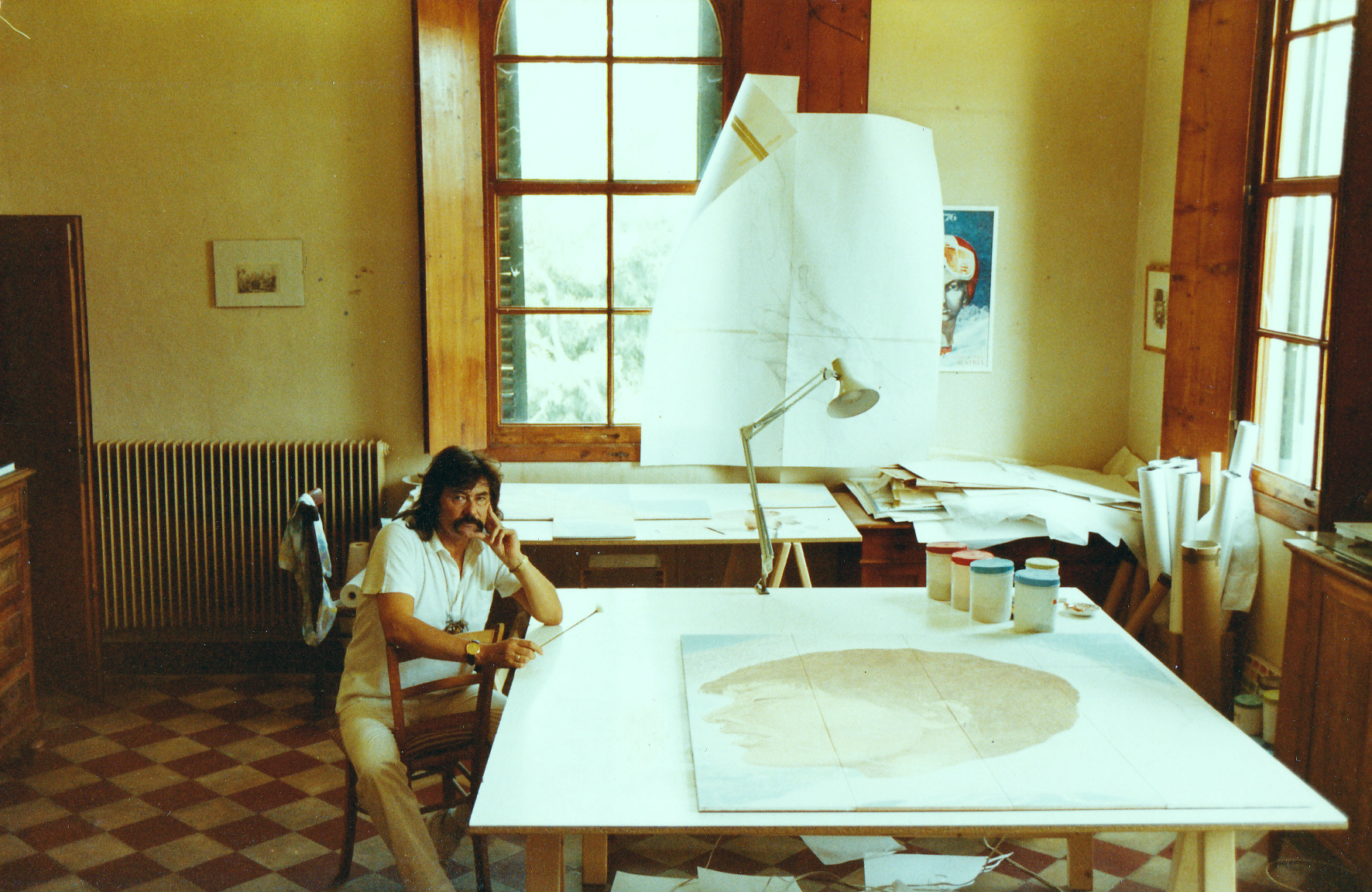
Leherb in Faenza

Helmut Leherb (14 March 1933 – 28 June 1997) was an Austrian artist and representative of the Vienna School of Fantastic Realism, which is close to Surrealism. He was born Helmut Leherbauer in Vienna and is also known as Maître Leherb.

== Career ==
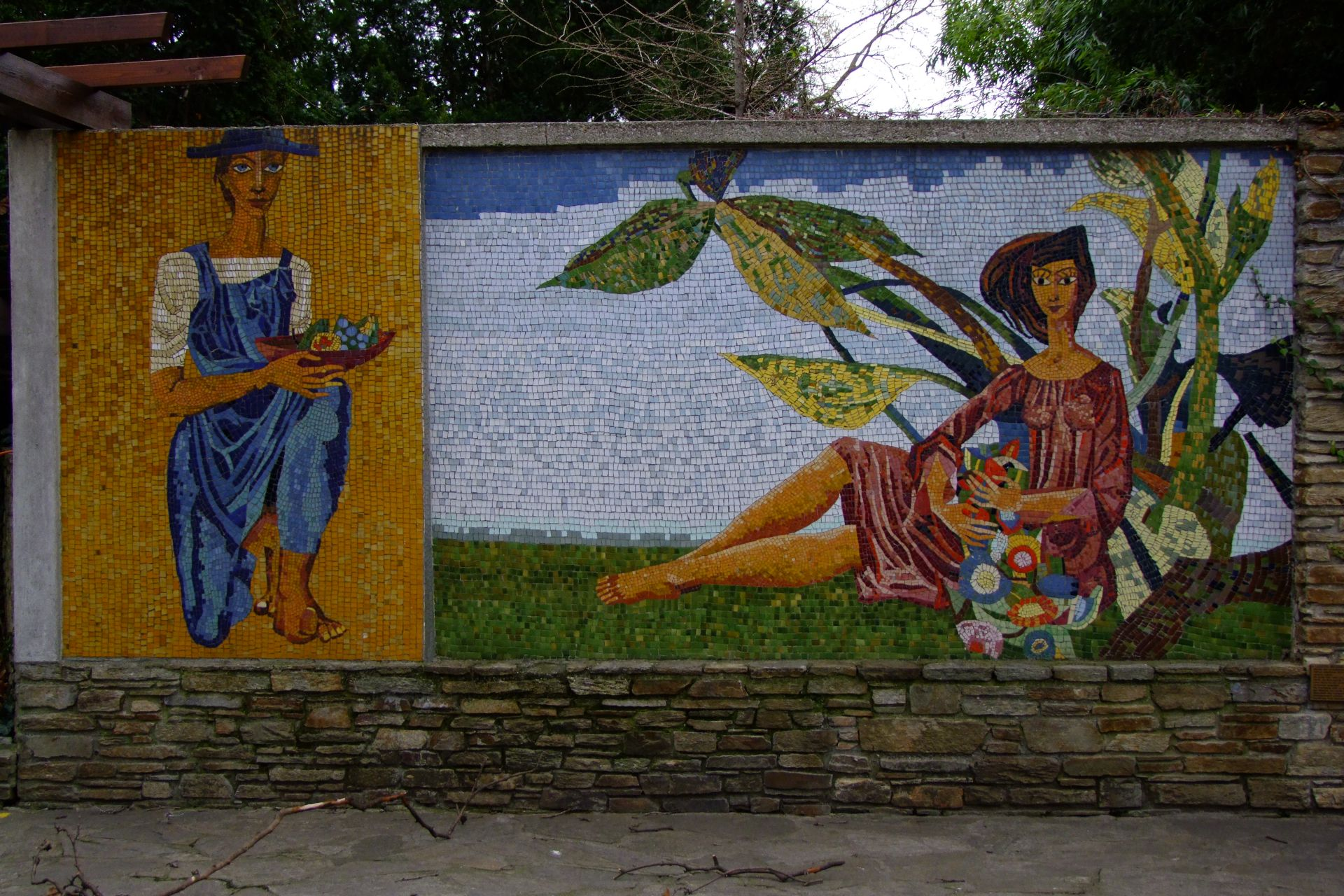
Mosaic by Leherb in the Kagran School Garden in Vienna-Donaustadt

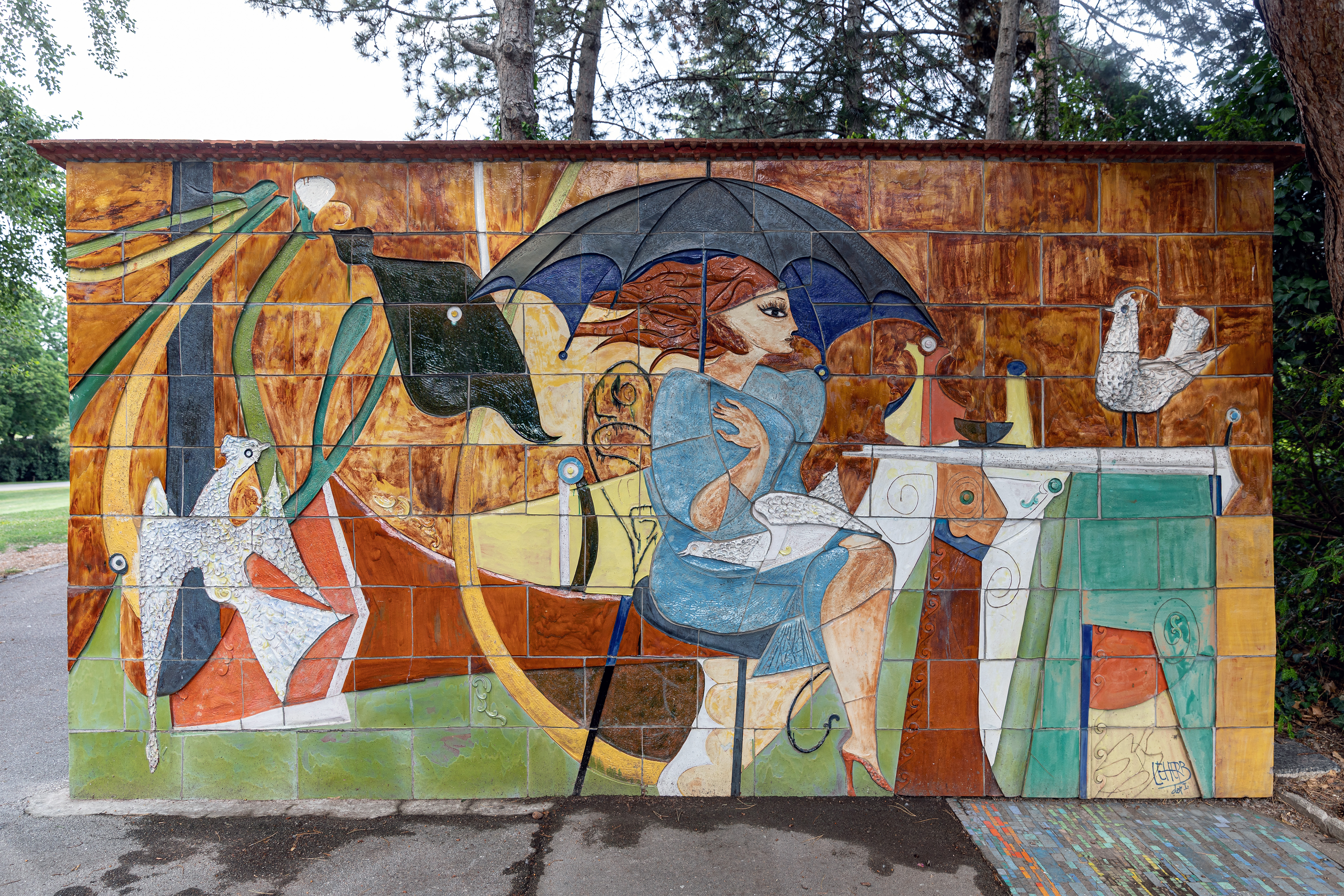
Mosaik Kaffeehausszene in Donaupark

He was the son of a school headmaster who died in 1945 after the liberation of Austria as a result of National Socialist imprisonment. Helmut Leherbauer graduated from the Hernalser Gymnasium Geblergasse in Vienna in 1951 and studied at the University of Applied Arts Vienna and the Stockholm Royal Academy (Royal Swedish Academy of Fine Arts) from 1948 to 1954. In 1955 he moved back to Vienna to the Academy of Fine Arts in the class of Albert Paris Gütersloh, where he witnessed the direct confrontation with Surrealism. Gütersloh co-founded the Art Club and is considered the founder of the Vienna School of Fantastic Realism. Leherb thus found access to this circle of artists and organised various exhibitions together with other representatives of this art movement, for example with Anton Lehmden, Rudolf Hausner and Wolfgang Hutter. In 1959 their works were shown at the Upper Belvedere. At that time, the art critic Johann Muschik coined the name of Fantastic Realism, which is still valid today.

From 1959 to 1963, works of art were created in Viennese parks that still exist today:

- Vienna Prater: the ceramic relief painting Tschinellen-Fiffy (near the Ferris Wheel) and the Sonntagsgwand (facing the Prater Star), both from 1959.
- In the school garden Kagran: the mosaic Flower Goddess Flora and Gardener God Vertumnus from 1960
- In the Volkspark Laaerberg: the ceramic Day & Night from 1962
- At the Kaffeehausberg in the Donaupark: the ceramic relief picture Kaffeehauszene and the floor mosaic Die Vögel des Leherb (a joint work with Hermann Bauch, both from 1963), this on the occasion of the Vienna International Garden Show - WIG 1964, as the Donaupark was originally called.

The central motifs that can be found in many of his paintings are his own person, that of his wife, the painter Lotte Profohs (b. 16 November 1934, d. 2012) or his son, Anselm Daniel Leherb. Throughout his life, he was a Viennese society darling due to his personal forms of representation. Leherb also lived in France, Belgium and Italy. In Paris he made the acquaintance of André Breton, who called him the "black prince of surrealism". However, Leherb was disgusted by what he perceived as "Parisian decadence" and allegedly poured a wine glass on Breton.

=== The Biennale Scandal ===
In 1964, Leherb was nominated for the Venice Biennale with his Time Destruction Manifesto, but his participation was prevented by the new Minister of Education Theodor Piffl-Perčević (ÖVP) after a government reshuffle. The plan was to have a deep blue pavilion with dead pigeons, umbrellas and dolls stuck to the walls. An art scandal was looming, and the leading art journal in Paris "Arts et Loisirs" ran the headline "First scandal of the Venice Biennale! The German magazine "Stern" put the scandal on the front page: "Surrealist Leherb: no white mice for Venice" and was not sparing with outbursts against the "cultural country" Austria.

Walter Koschatzky described Piffl-Perčević's understanding of art in his memoirs as "frighteningly low". The deselection troubled Leherb but boosted his profile enormously and opened the doors to the most important galleries in Europe: Galerie de la Madeleine and Isy Brachot in Brussels, Galerie C.A.W. in Antwerp, la Medusa in Rome; Galerie Mokum in Amsterdam, Peithner-Lichtenfels and Wolfrum in Vienna and Galleria Viotti in Turin.

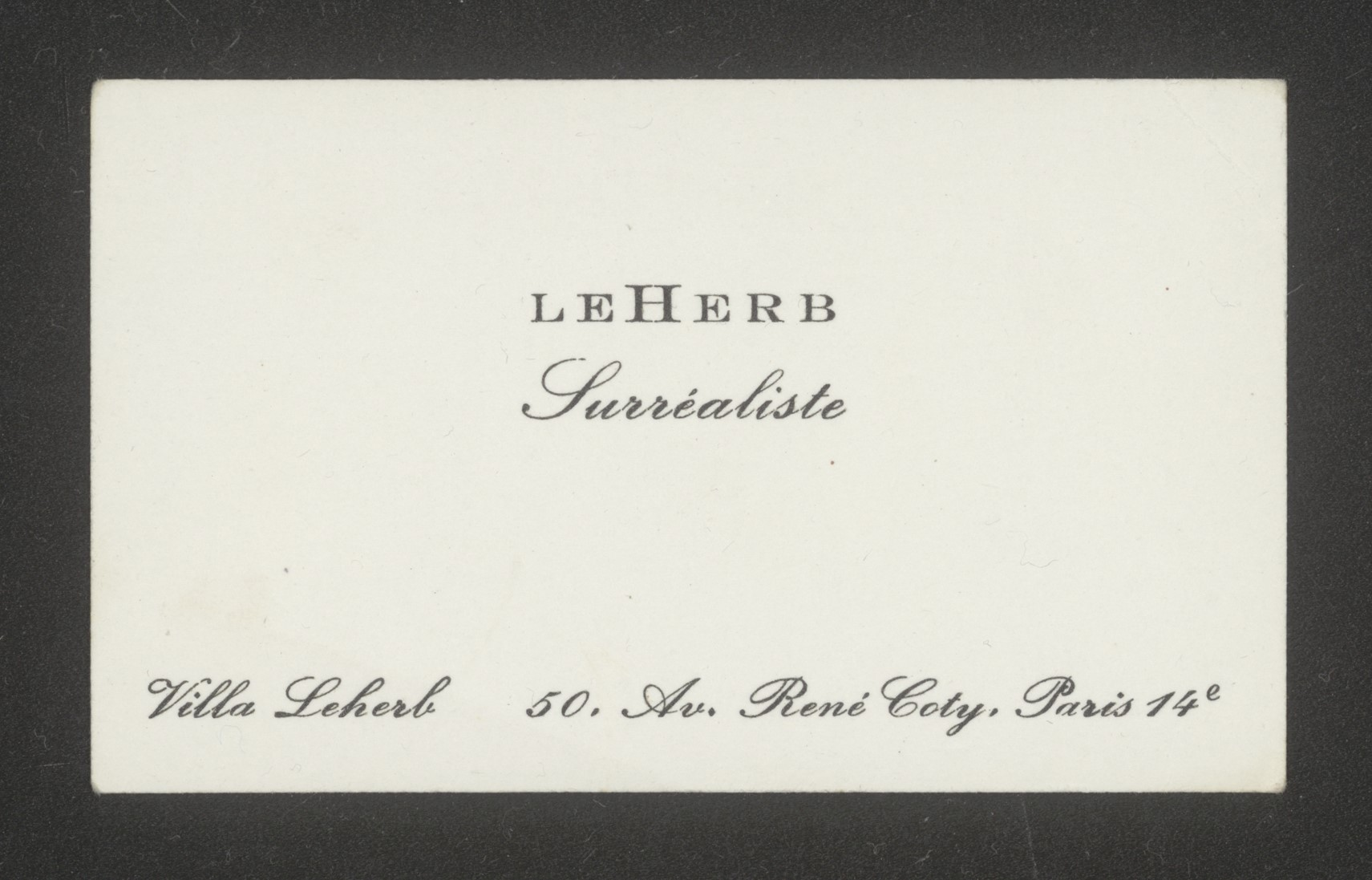
Business card Leherb

Leherb, fascinated by painterly valeur, the watercolour-like sfumato, and continued to realise ceramic reliefs and mosaics. In 1963, he created the "Reactionary Confirmation Dream" in the Villa Cabasso in Aix-en-Provence. In 1964 he created the ceramic mural "Explosion of Silence", for the building of the Central Savings Bank of the Municipality of Vienna.

=== Advertising Austria and the Olympics ===
In 1971 / 1972, Leherb was commissioned by the later "Österreich Werbung" (Austrian National Tourist Office "ANTO") (then still Österreichische Fremdenverkehrswerbung, ÖFVW) to design four posters. The posters "I like Mozart", "A girl playing her cello on a cloud", "Island of Longing" and "A lady with a Lipizzaner" were created. The then chairman of the ÖFVW, Trade Minister Josef Staribacher, staged the launch of the new series with publicity: he set the printing press in motion himself. The posters were quickly sold out. A possible new edition is being planned.

In 1976, the design of the poster for the Winter Olympics in Innsbruck followed: a Greek head, which Leherb provided with a modern crash helmet, glasses and, as a reminder of the limits of competitive sport, a time clock. This representation was embedded in the Leherb blue. This poster is also long out of print.

This was followed by a faience painting more than seventeen metres long and five and a half metres high for the rehabilitation centre at the "Weißer Hof" in Klosterneuburg.

=== Italy and his most monumental work ===
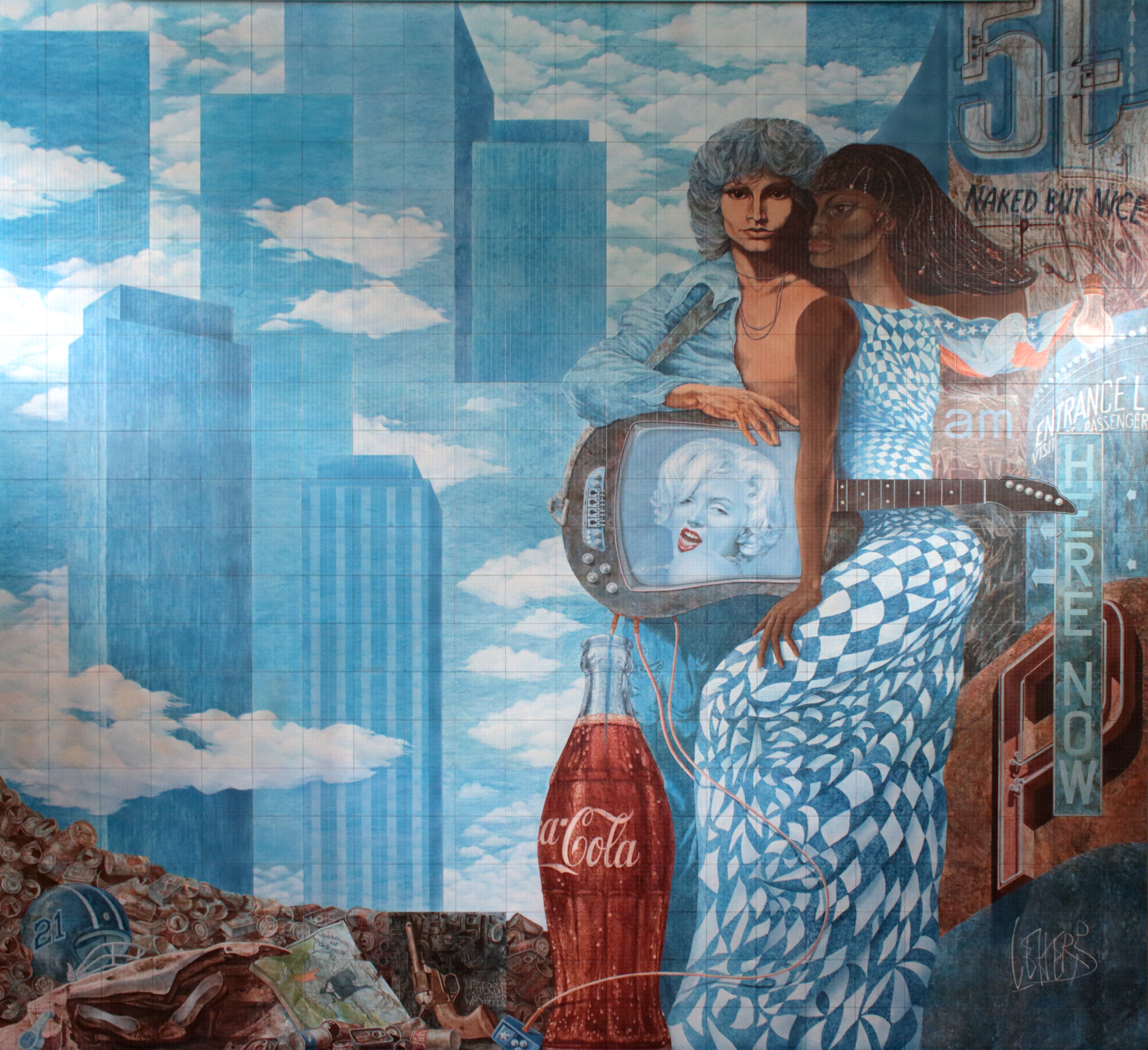
Faience 8x8 meters one of the six continents

In Faenza, Italy, in the early 1980s, Leherb created the "largest faience ever made", a 380-square-metre mosaic for the new building of the Vienna University of Economics and Business, which was opened in 1982, "The Continents", during which he suffered severe health damage from the ceramic dust. In twelve years of work, an imaginary portrait of the continents Asia, Europe, America, Africa, Antarctica and Australia was created with more than 3500 small ceramic plates.

Leherb himself said: "No workshop, no expert, no ceramist in the European ceramic centres considered the realisation of eight by eight metre majolica paintings technically feasible in 1980: it has never been done, it will never be done, and a Leherb will not succeed in doing such a thing.

Leherb on the technique: "One works on brittle, fragile clay plates that are coated with majolica dust, the so-called 'smalt', a glaze consisting mainly of metal oxides mixed with water. This painting ground is unstable and can be destroyed by any improper touch. Thus, a one-metre-high floor vase is considered a masterly feat. For eight by eight metre majolica panel paintings - the dimension corresponds to a two-storey house façade - there were neither comparative nor empirical values. I moved countless tons of art during the process of creating these 'university faiences'. For motifs such as faces, bodies, hands, there was a process of creation that made it necessary for me to move panels up to 25 and 30 times from the six-metre-high scaffolding down to the detail easel without being allowed to touch the surface. It was not possible to sketch the huge figures in advance, you can't draw on dust.

From 1993 to 1994 he created the university fountain "A Door for Eurydice", which can be seen in Badgasse in Vienna IX (Location). From 1989 to 1991 Leherb created the oversized work "Gate for an Imaginary Museum" in bronze and ceramics for the Goldscheider manufactory in Stoob, Burgenland, as well as two ceramic vase heads (each limited to 140 pieces

He also recorded a record entitled Autodafé of a Surrealist.

Although Leherb was a representative of the Viennese School of Fantastic Realism, he later turned away from the style of other representatives such as Arik Brauer and Ernst Fuchs and increasingly towards Surrealism.

Leherb died of a stroke in 1997 in Vienna. He was survived by his wife, the painter Lotte Profohs, his son Anselm Daniel (1960–2001) and his granddaughter, Angela. He was buried at the Vienna Central Cemetery. In 2018, Leherbweg was named after him in Vienna-Donaustadt (22nd district).

== Awards ==
- Honorary member of the Academia Fiorentina delle Belli Arti e Disegno, since 1967
- Grand Prize of the Fondation Internationale des Collectionneurs d'Art, Paris 1968
- Gold Medal of the Biennale Internazionale della Grafica, Florence 1969
- Lauréat du Livre d'Or des Valeurs Humaines, Paris 1970
- Ambrogino d'Oro del Senato d'Arte; Milan 1972
- Elefante d'Oro e gran Premio; Rome-Catania 1972
- Austrian Cross of Honour for Science and Art I. Class, Vienna 1974
- Cavaliere Ufficiale nell'Ordine al merito dell'Republica Italiana, Rome 1990
- Tribun del Tribunato di Romagna, Ravenna 1992
- Golden Badge of Honour "pro meroti" on the ribbon of the Board of Trustees of the Vienna University of Economics and Business Administration, Vienna 1992

== Work ( extract) ==
- Paintings
  - Déjeuner chez Leherb
  - Auf der Suche nach der verlorenen Zeit (In search of lost time)
  - Kattowitzer Madonna
  - Le roi, c'est moi
  - Goldfrau (Golden Woman)
  - Die gefangene Diebin (The Captive Thief)
  - Verlust der Zärtlichkeit (Loss of tenderness)
  - Akt als Sesselrücklehne (Nude as chair backrest)
  - Taubenpapst
  - Dame mit Melone (Lady with a bowler hat)
  - Das Konzert (The Concert)
  - Gilbert Becaud
  - Surrealistischer Stierkampf (Surrealistic Bullfight)
  - Wiener Melange oder Blue Lady (Viennese Coffee Melange or Blue Lady)
  - Monna Lotte
  - Lipizzaner
  - ParaNoia
- Records
  - Autodafé of a Surrealist
  - Lotte & Leherb: Irre gut, Philips 6322011, together with Lotte Profohs, arr. & cond. Toni Stricker, 1974

== Literature ==
- Czeike, Felix (2004). Historisches Lexikon Wien : in 6 Bänden. 6, Ergänzungsband. Wien: Kremayr & Scheriau. pp. 116–117. ISBN 3-218-00741-0. OCLC 634715731.
- Leherb, Helmut (1975). Leherb sieht Paris. Wien: Kremayr & Scheriau. ISBN 3-218-00273-7. OCLC 2333229.
- Dechant, Robert E. (2007). Goldscheider : Firmengeschichte und Werkverzeichnis; Historismus, Jugendstil, Art Deco, 1950er Jahre = History of the company and catalogue of works : Historicism, Art Nouveau, Art Deco, the fifties. Filipp Goldscheider. Stuttgart: Arnoldsche. ISBN 978-3-89790-216-9. OCLC 191031844.
- Arcade Paris Bruxelles (Hg.): Leherb. Le Monde d´un Surrealiste. The World of a surrealist. Die Welt eines Surrealisten. Il mondo di un surrealista. Paris, Brüssel 1973
- Lotte Profohs, Hans Otto Ressler: Tagträumer und Nachtwandlerin, Wien 2016 (Biographie aus der Sicht von Lotte Profohs)
