= Wolfgang Hutter =

Austrian artist (1928–2014)

Wolfgang Hutter (December 13, 1928 – September 26, 2014) was a painter, draughtsman, printmaker and stage designer. Hutter's imagery is characterised by an artificial paradise of gardens and fantastical fairytale-like scenes. His work is said to have been influenced by his psychedelic experiences.

Hutter was born in Vienna. With Jewish origins, the son of A. P. von Gütersloh, Hutter studied at the Academy of Fine Arts in Vienna under Professor Robin C. Andersen and then under his father. Together with Ernst Fuchs, Maître Leherb (Helmut Leherb), Rudolf Hausner, Fritz Janschka, Anton Lehmden and Arik Brauer, he is one of the main representatives and founding members of the Vienna School of Fantastic Realism. Hutter was awarded the UNESCO Prize at the Venice Biennale in 1954. In 1966, he was appointed a professorship at the University of Applied Arts Vienna.

== Bibliography ==
- O. Breicha, Wolfgang Hutter – Werkkatalog, Vienna 1977.
- Tatowierungen. (Foreword Alfred Schmeller) Verlag Grasl, Baden b. Wien 1965
- Berichte aus einer anderen Welt (Introduction Otto Breicha) Waldheim-Eberle Verlagshaus, Wien 1967
- Auflage in zwei Bande (1. "Malerei und Zeichnung; Schriften zu "Kunst und Urwelt" (Preface A. P. Gutersloh).
- Graphik; "Über sich selbst nachzudenken" (in Conversation with Wolfgang Hutter), Essay und Werkkatalog Otto Breicha. Verlag Jugend und Volk, Wien— München 1977
- Zauberflote (Monographie über das gleichnamige Portfolio, mit einem beigelegten Text "Zur Zauberflote" von Wolfgang Hutter), Euro-Art-Bucherkreis GmbH, Wien 1974
- Federmenschen (with an introduction by Wolfgang Hutter) (Self-published.)
