= Gütersloh (disambiguation) =

Gütersloh is a town in Germany, in North Rhine-Westphalia.

Gütersloh may also refer to:

- Gütersloh (district), a Kreis (district) in the north-east of North Rhine-Westphalia
  - FC Gütersloh, football club based in Gütersloh
  - RAF Gütersloh, Royal Air Force German military base near the town

== People with the surname ==
- Albert Paris Gütersloh (1887–1973), Austrian painter and writer
