= Vladimir Ryklin =

- Владимир Михайлович Рыклин
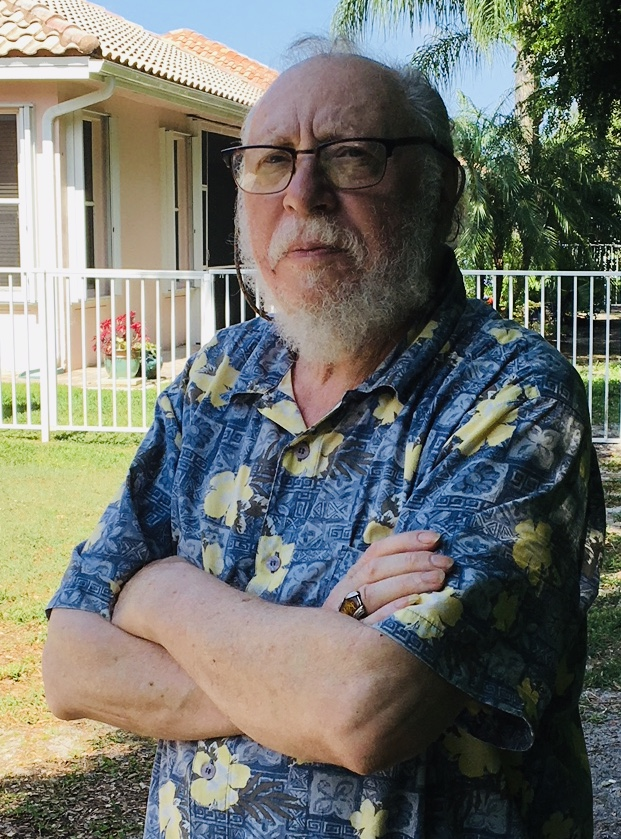
- Born: March 25, 1934; Moscow
- Education: Moscow Academic Art Сollege
- Known for: Painting
- Style: fantastic realism

Vladimir Mikhailovich Ryklin (Russian: Владимир Михайлович Рыклин; March 25, 1934, Moscow) is a Soviet and American graphic artist, poster artist, one of the brightest representatives of Russian fantastic realism. Member of the Artists' Union of the USSR.

== Biography ==
Vladimir Ryklin was born on March 25, 1934, in Moscow. He served in the navy, on the Soviet cruiser Kirov.

In 1960 he graduated from the “Moscow Regional Pedagogical School of Fine Arts in memory of the 1905 uprising”. He worked in the field of cultural and entertainment (mainly circus) posters, industrial graphics, book illustrations. In 1976 he emigrated to the United States as part of a group of famous avant-garde Soviet artists and sculptors (including Ernst Neizvestny, Mihail Chemiakin). Prior to his retirement, he worked as a stage artist on the David Letterman show and as a lead artist on Saturday Night Live.

== Art ==
Creator of several posters for the Vienna State Opera, New York City Ballet, Moscow State Circus. Participated in numerous group and solo exhibitions in the US, Canada, Poland, England, Belgium.

In the picturesque world of Vladimir Ryklin, the author's favorite literary heroes (Alonso Quijano, Sancho Panza, the characters of Bulgakov's The Master and Margarita and the stories of Edgar Allan Poe), historical figures (Napoleon, Lenin, Rasputin), musicians, poets and artists (Paganini, Vysotsky, Andy Warhol, Aubrey Beardsley).

Paintings by Vladimir Ryklin

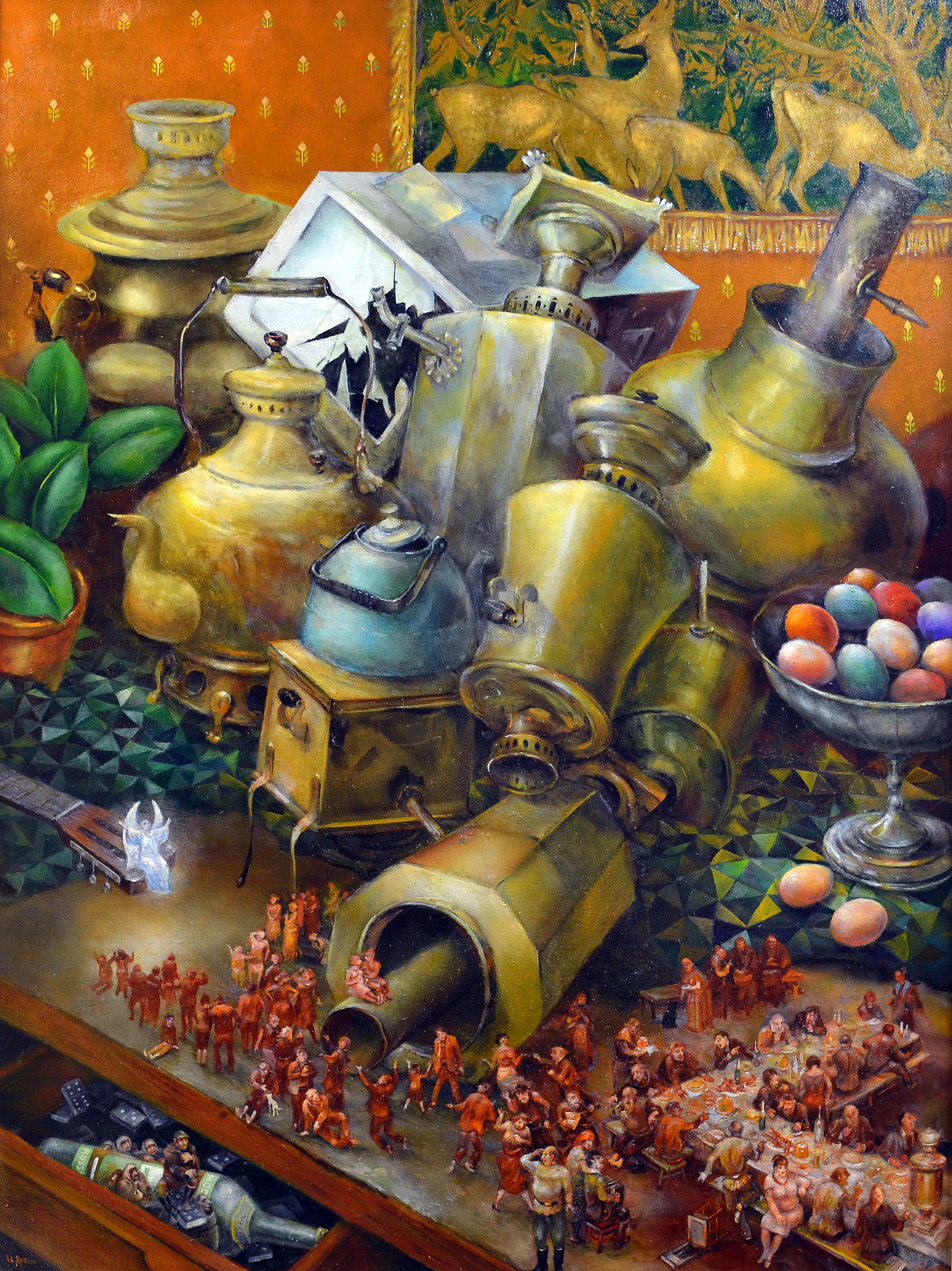
Angel

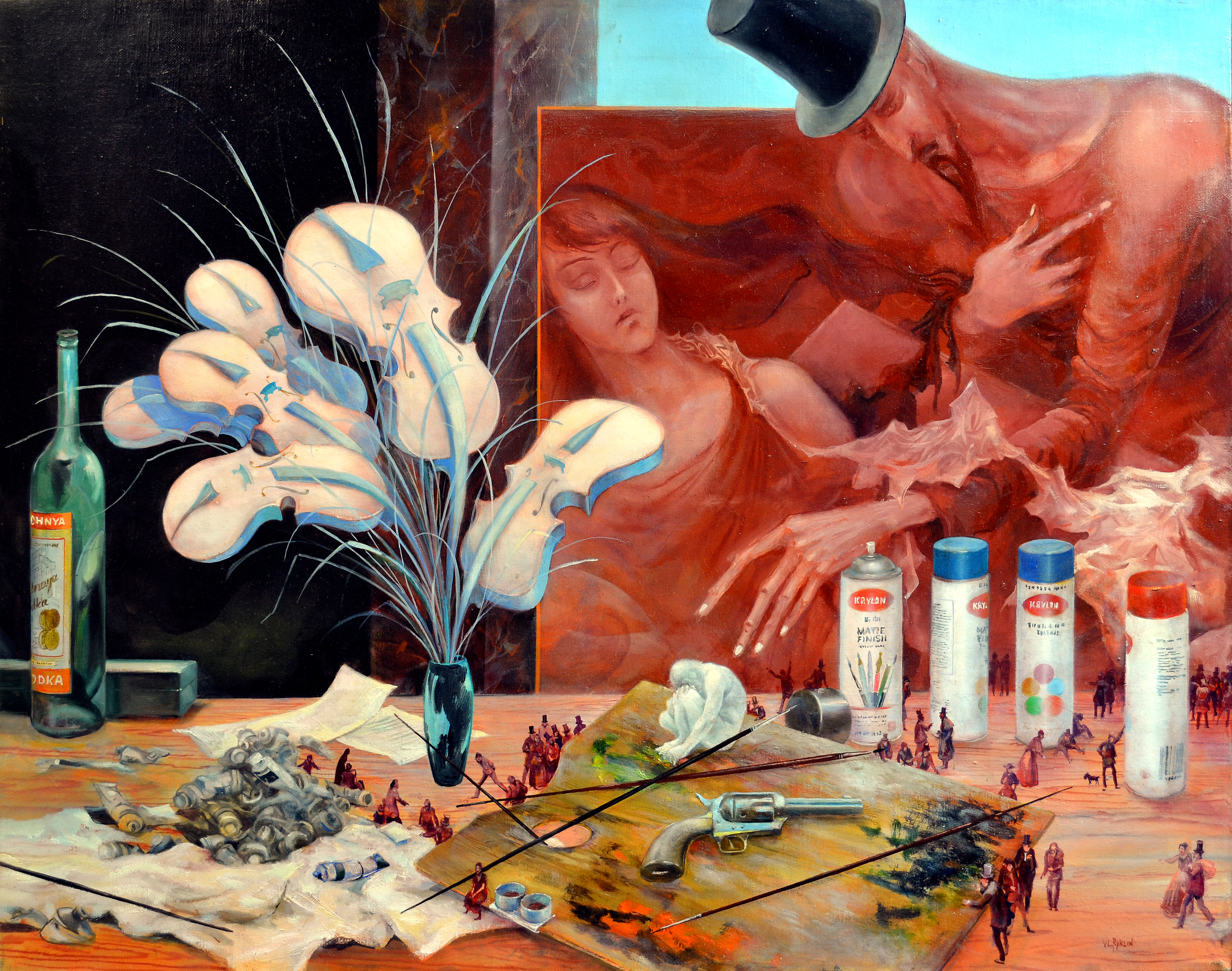
Blues

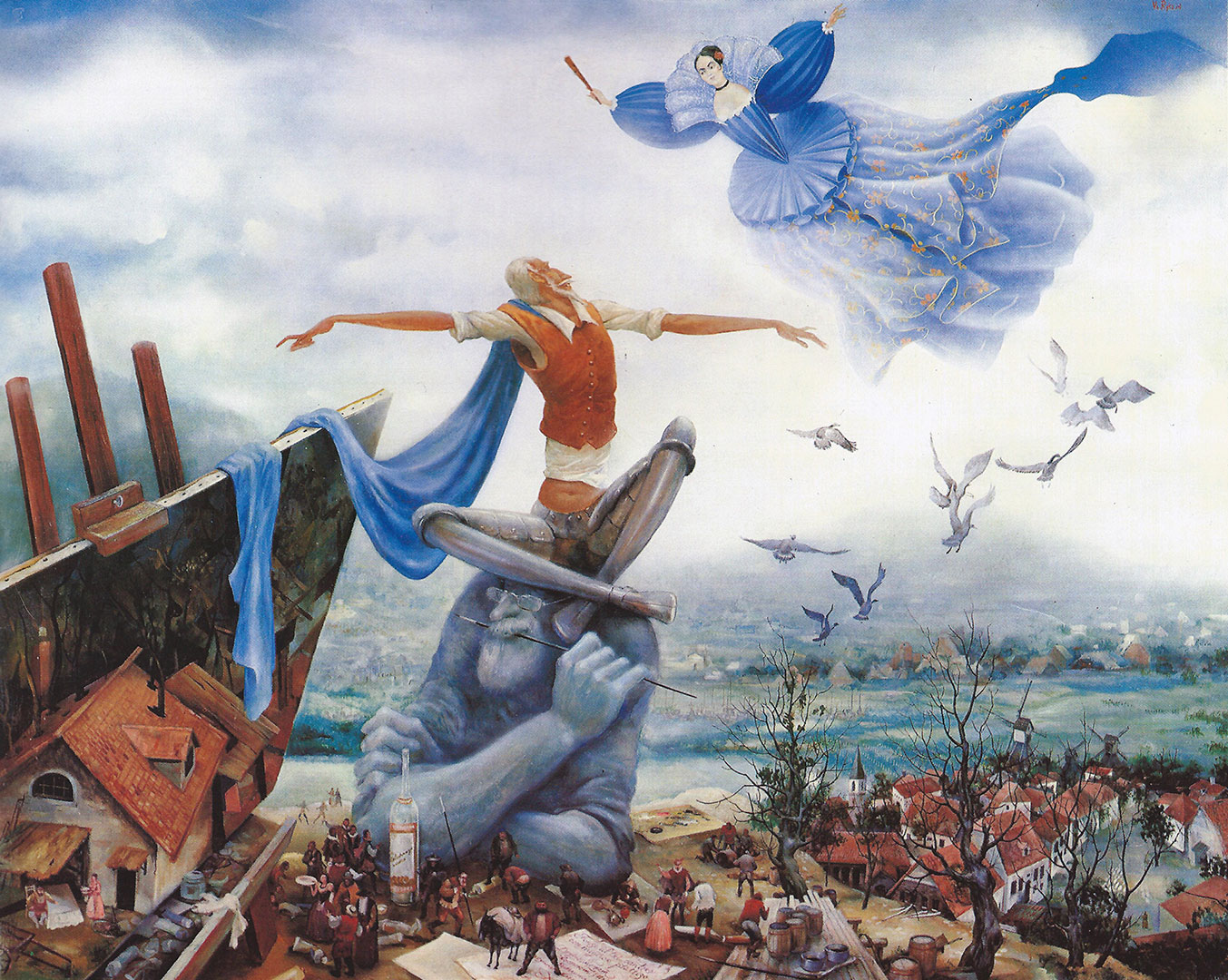
Don Quixote's Dreams

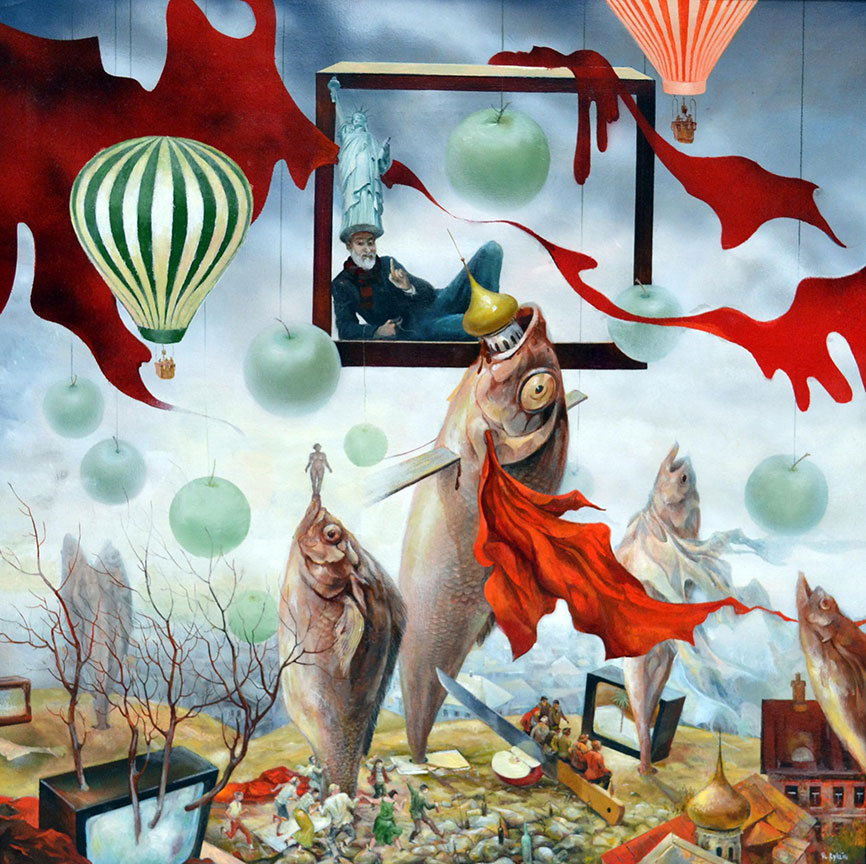
Science Freedom

== Honours and awards ==
1st prize of the Competition for the best poster of the year (USSR, 1974).

== Bibliography ==
- Emily Genauer, New York Post, 11/29/1975.
- Jules Rosenthal, Soviet Émigré Artists Exhibit, The Jewish Week, Washington, D.C. April 15–21, 1976, page 19.
- «Horror and Hope» by Greg Gianas, Art Seeker, La Jolla Night Paper, Feb 28, 1980.
