= Arnulf Rainer =

Austrian painter (1929–2025)

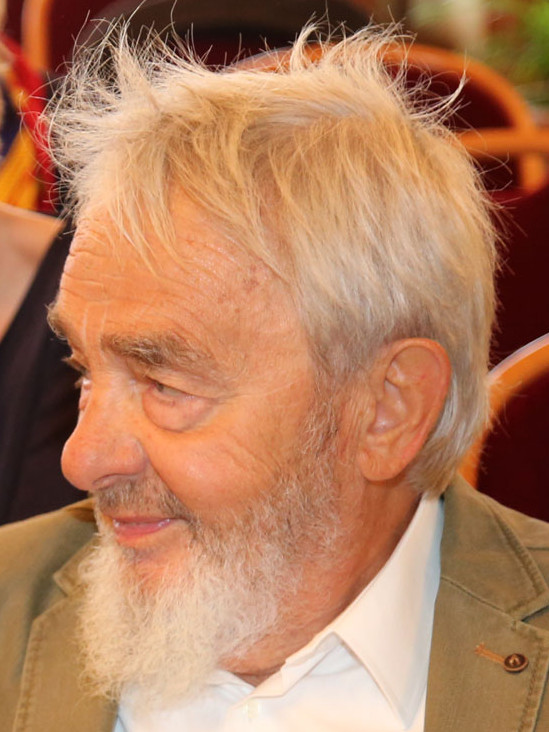
- Rainer in 2015
- Born: 8 December 1929; Baden, Austria
- Died: 18 December 2025 (aged 96)
- Known for: Painting
- Movement: Contemporary art

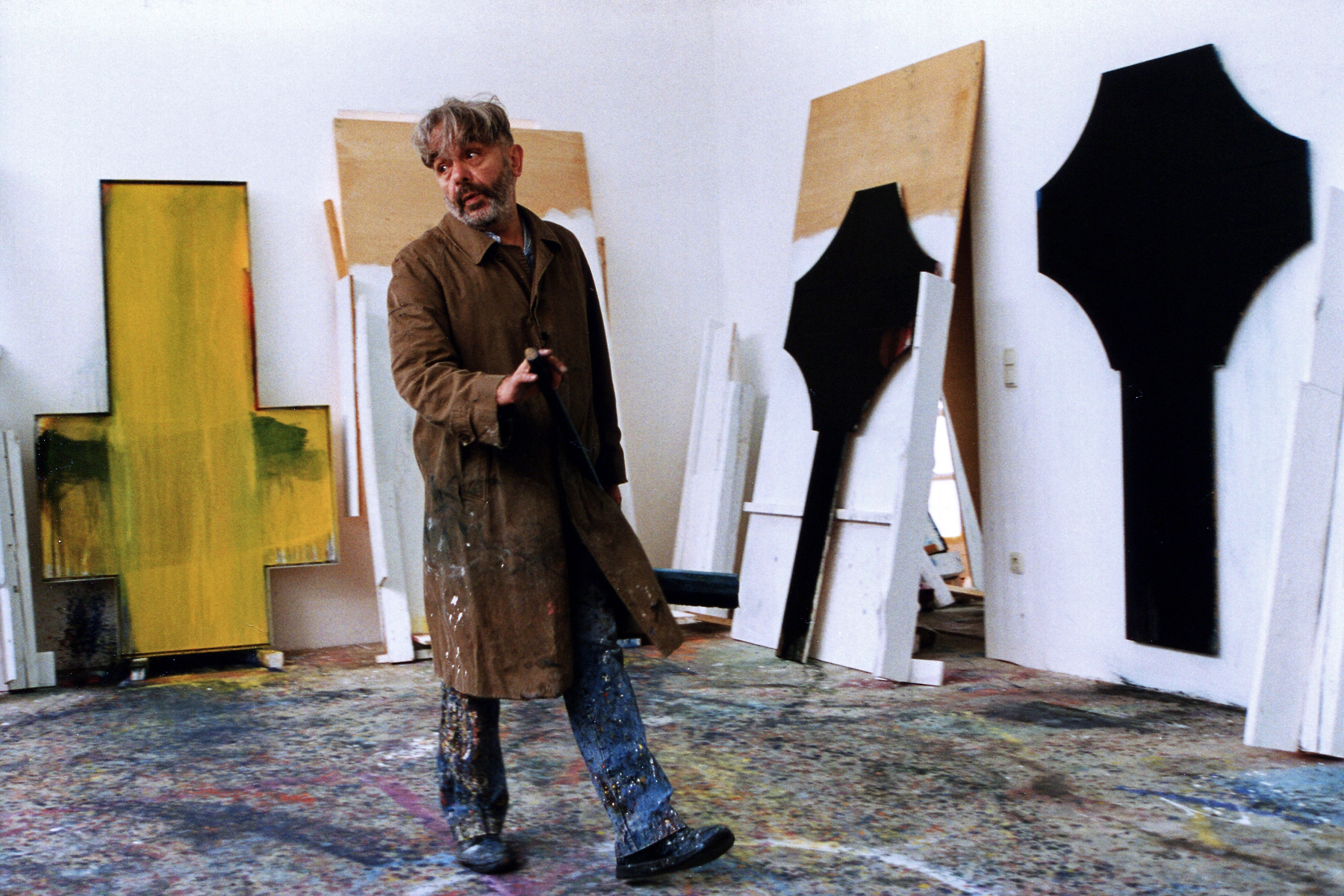
Rainer in Arnulf Rainer - Sternsucher a 1994 film by Herbert Brödl

Arnulf Rainer (8 December 1929 – 18 December 2025) was an Austrian painter noted for his abstract informal art.

== Life and career ==
Rainer was born in Baden, Austria. During his early years, he was influenced by Surrealism. In 1950, he founded the Hundsgruppe ("dog group") together with Ernst Fuchs, Arik Brauer, and Josef Mikl. After 1954, Rainer's style evolved towards Destruction of Forms, with blackenings, overpaintings, and maskings of illustrations and photographs dominating his later work. He was close to the Vienna Actionism, featuring body art and painting under the influence of drugs. He painted extensively on the subject of Hiroshima such as it relates to the nuclear bombing of the Japanese city and the inherent political and physical fallout.

In 1978, he received the Grand Austrian State Prize. In the same year, and in 1980, he became the Austrian representative at the Venice Biennale. From 1981 to 1995, Rainer held a professorship at the Academy of Fine Arts in Vienna - the same place where he aborted his own studies after three days, unsatisfied.

His works are shown in the Museum of Modern Art, the Arnulf Rainer Museum in Baden Austria and the Solomon R. Guggenheim Museum. As the culmination of the appraisal of his work, the Arnulf Rainer Museum opened in New York City in 1993. His works have also continuously been shown at the European Cultural Centre's palazzos in Venice during the Biennale since 2011. In the same year, he published the work Unfinished into Death (ISBN 9789490784072) with the same organisation.

Rainer died on 18 December 2025, at the age of 96.
