= Albert Paris Gütersloh =

Austrian painter and writer

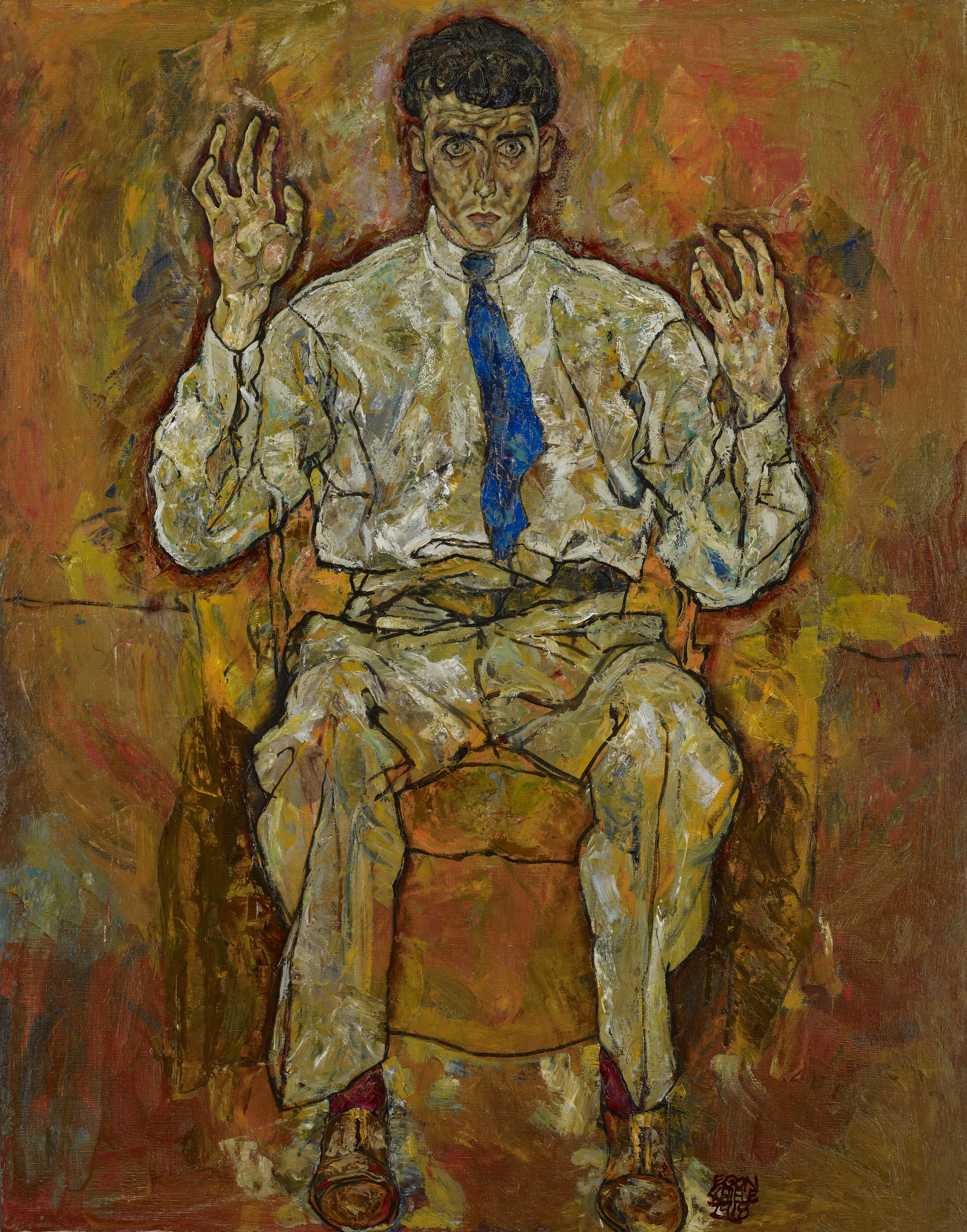
Albert Paris Gütersloh, portrait by Egon Schiele, 1918.

Portrait of a Woman, 1914,(oil on canvas, 54.6 cm × 38.5 cm), Leopold Museum Private Foundation, Vienna

Albert Paris Gütersloh (born Albert Conrad Kiehtreiber; 5 February 1887 – 16 May 1973) was an Austrian painter and writer.

Gütersloh worked as actor, director, and stage designer before he focused on painting in 1921.

As a teacher of Arik Brauer, Ernst Fuchs, Ruth Rogers-Altmann, Wolfgang Hutter, Fritz Janschka and Anton Lehmden he is considered one of the largest influences on the Vienna School of Fantastic Realism.

== Decorations and awards ==
- 1922 Theodor Fontane Prize for Arts and Letters
- 1926 Reichel Prize (1926)
- 1928 Grand Prix, Paris (1928) for his tapestries
- 1935 National Award for Painting (1935)
- 1937 Grand Prix, Paris (1937)
- 1948 City of Vienna Prize for Painting and Graphics
- 1952 Grand Austrian State Prize for Visual Arts
- 1961 Grand Austrian State Prize for Literature
- 1957 Ring of Honour of the City of Vienna
- 1961 City of Vienna Prize for poetry
- 1967 City of Vienna Prize for Literature
- 1967 Austrian Decoration for Science and Art
- 1987 Austrian commemorative postage stamp to mark his 100th birthday

== See also ==
Facing the Modern: The Portrait in Vienna 1900
