= Anton Lehmden =

Austrian artist (1929–2018)

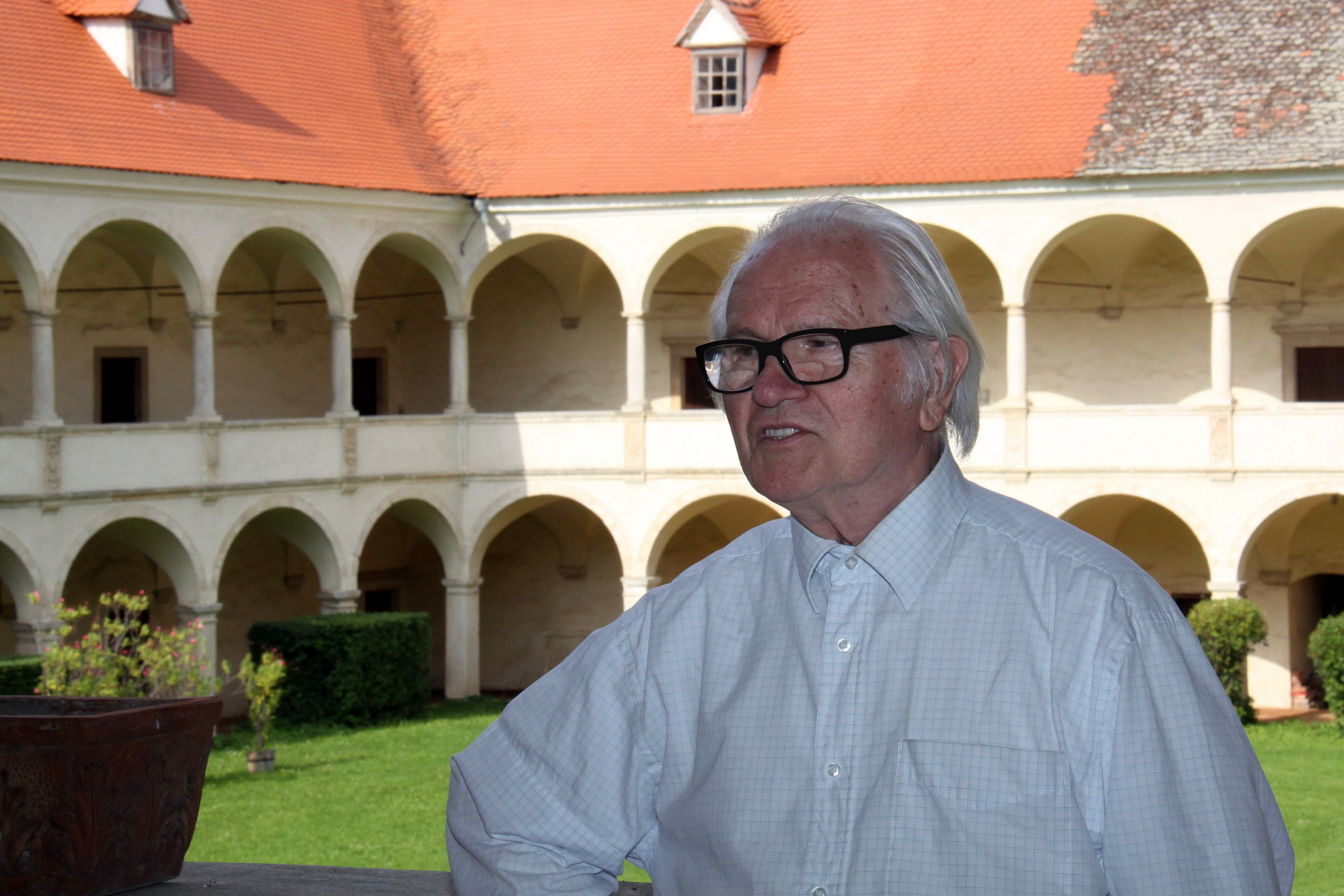
Lehmden at his castle in 2011

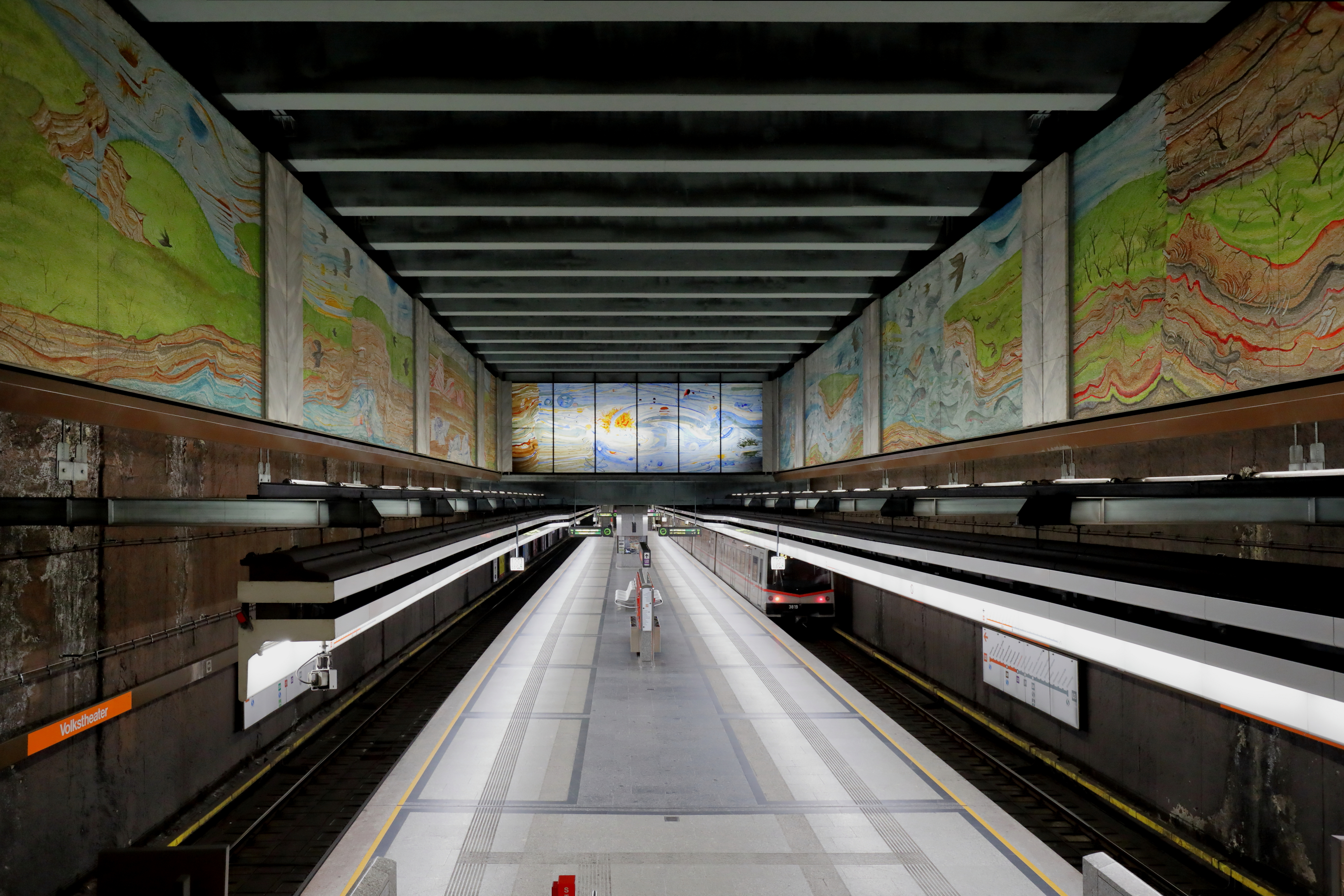
360 square meter glass mosaic Das Werden der Natur in the Volksgarten U3 station, Vienna

Anton Lehmden (2 January 1929 – 7 August 2018) was an Austrian painter, draughtsman, and printmaker.

== Biography ==
Lehmden was a co-founder, together with Ernst Fuchs, Maître Leherb (Helmut Leherb), Rudolf Hausner, Arik Brauer, Fritz Janschka and Wolfgang Hutter, of the Vienna School of Fantastic Realism. He settled in Vienna after 1945 and studied at the Academy of Fine Arts Vienna.

In 1948 he was represented in exhibitions of the Vienna Art-Club and has also been represented in many international exhibitions. He taught in Istanbul from 1962/63 and from 1971 to 1997 was Professor at the Academy of Fine Arts in Vienna.

Between 1947 and 1950 he went to participate in several exhibitions and important trips to Italy, which was the time his first major artworks were created. Lehmden's early works were inspired by his love for Chinese landscape painting, and his focus was mainly the lyrical moment in the landscape. However the recurring themes in his later works are war events and natural catastrophes, bursting and expressive scenes, mythical themes, cosmic dreams and apocalyptic visions over decades and in ever-changing variations. Traumatic war experiences are processed in images on themes such as "Panzerschlacht". In these works he also uses elements of architecture, monuments of the ancient world, which the Lehmden studied on his numerous journeys (such as the Colosseum in Rome or the Egyptian Pyramids).

Lehmden's work has been extensively exhibited in Italy, Austria, Japan, United States, Germany, Turkey and Poland.

Lehmden designed the subway station Volkstheater in Vienna in 1991.

In 1999, Lehmden was appointed an honorary citizen of Deutschkreutz town, where he also redesigned the parish church artistically. In 1984 he was awarded the Lovis-Corinth Prize.

In 1966 he acquired the Renaissance castle Schloss Deutschkreutz (Burgenland), which he then spent years restoring. Since 2003 the "Lehmden Sommerakademie" – Lehmden's summer painting school – has been held there. Since 2016 the castle is open for visitors in the summer months and guided tours are available.

== Literature ==
- Walter Schurian, Gerd Lindner: 1900 bis 2010: Phantastische Kunst aus Wien. Panorama-Museum, Bad Frankenhausen 2010 ISBN 9783938049174 (with Arik Brauer, Ernst Fuchs, Rudolf Hausner and Wolfgang Hutter)
- Norbert Langer: Aufschlüsse – Lovis-Corinth-Preis 1984 (Anton Lehmden und Roland Dörfler). In: Sudetenland: Europäische Kulturzeitschrift; Böhmen, Mähren, Schlesien; (1985)
