= Rudolf Hausner =

Austrian painter, draughtsman, printmaker and sculptor

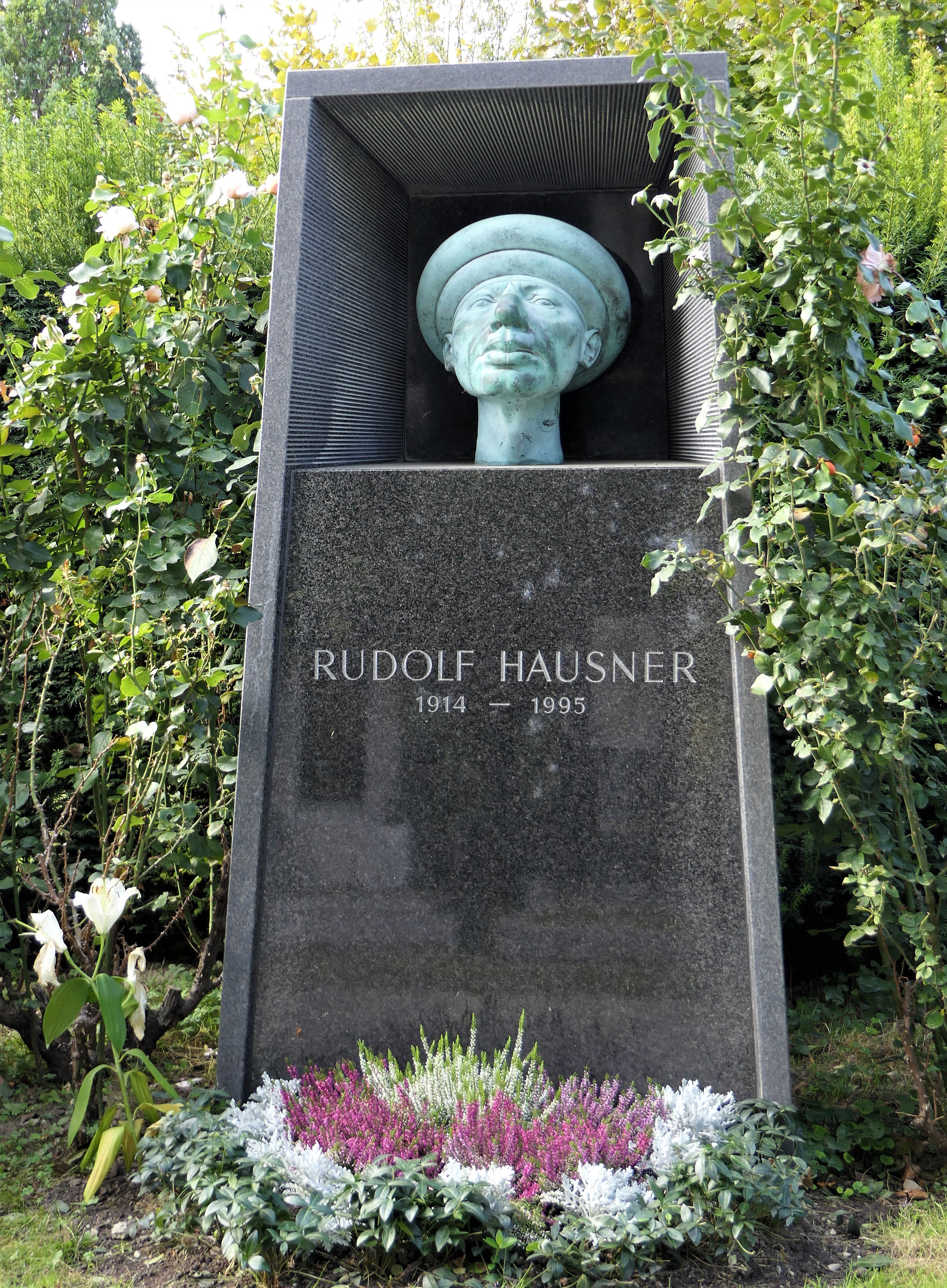
- Rudolf Hausner self-portrait as Adam at his grave at the Vienna Cemetery
- Born: 4 December 1914; Vienna, Austria-Hungary
- Died: 25 February 1995 (aged 80); Mödling, Austria
- Education: Academy of Fine Arts, Vienna
- Movement: Surrealism, Vienna School of Fantastic Realism

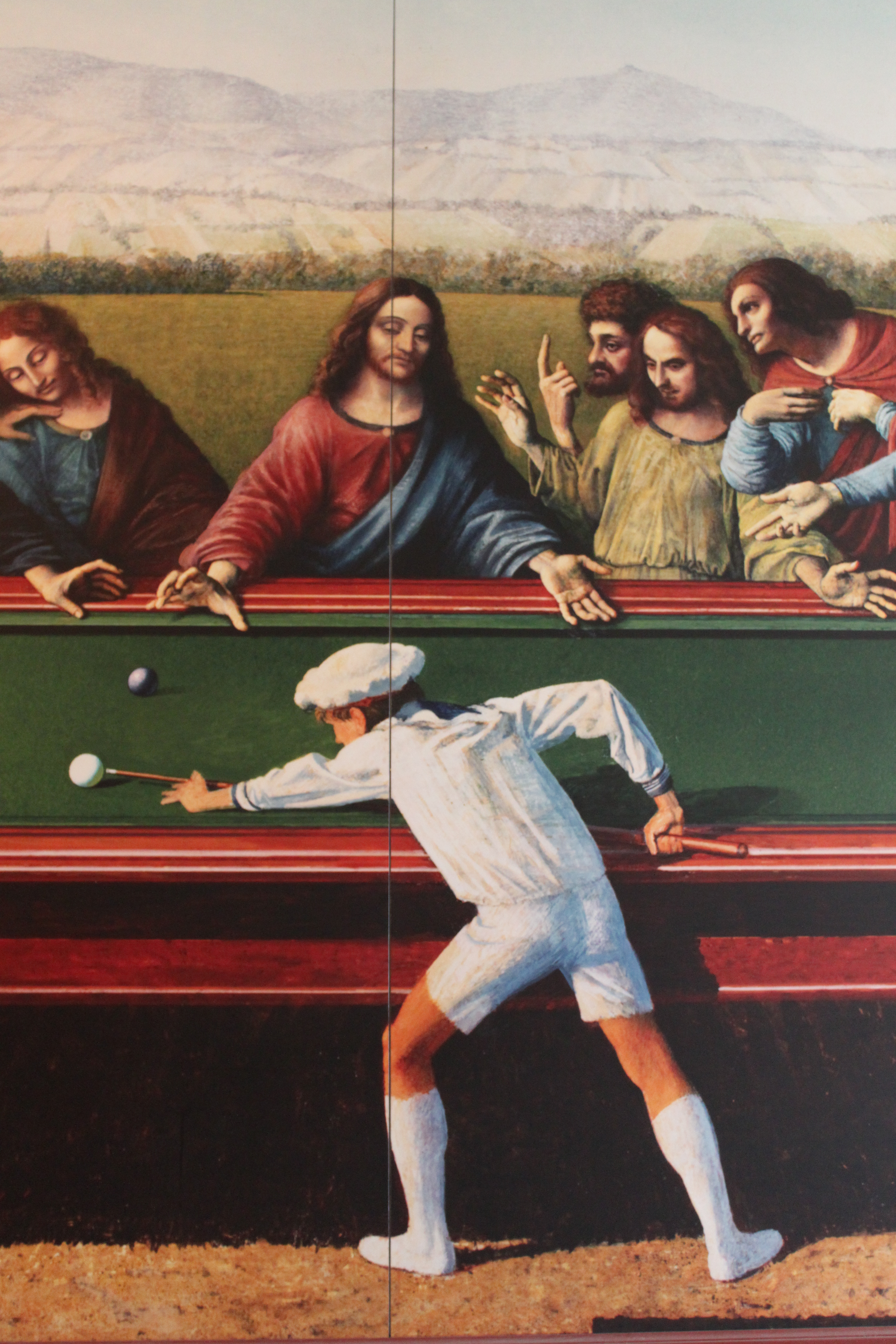
Hausners Adam vor den Autoritäten I (1994)

Rudolf Hausner (4 December 1914, Vienna – 25 February 1995, Mödling) was an Austrian painter, draughtsman, printmaker and sculptor. Hausner has been described as a "psychic realist" and "the first psychoanalytical painter" (Gunter Engelhardt).

== Early life ==
Of Jewish origins, Hausner's father was a commercial employee, and he worked as a Sunday painter, which made his son enthusiastic about art since early on. From 1923 to 1925 he attended the Schubert Realschule (today Erich Fried Realgymnasium), then the Realgymnasium Schottenbastei in Vienna, until 1931. Hausner studied at the Academy of Fine Arts in Vienna from 1931 until 1936, with Carl Fahringer and Karl Sterrer.

In 1937, Hausner was drafted into the Austrian Armed Forces. In 1938, after the Anschluss, his painting was banned from being exhibited by the Reich Chamber of Culture, considered degenerate art. In 1941 he was drafted into the German Armed Forces. During this time there was his formative traumatic log cabin experience in the Russian Tatra Mountains, which he would reflect in his later works. In 1943, Hausner was dismissed by the Wehrmacht, declared unfit for war, and was employed as a technical draftsman in the armaments industry. In 1944, Hausner married Irene Schmied. During the last days of the World War II he was assigned to an air defense unit.

== Following World War II ==
After the war, he returned to his bomb-damaged studio in Vienna and resumed work as an artist. In 1946 he founded a surrealist group together with Edgar Jené, Ernst Fuchs, Maître Leherb (Helmut Leherb), Wolfgang Hutter and Fritz Janschka. They were later joined by Arik Brauer and Anton Lehmden. He joined the Art-Club and had his first one-man exhibition in the Konzerthaus, Vienna. A key work of this period, It's me! (1948; Vienna, Hist. Mus.), shows his awareness of Pittura Metafisica and surrealism in a psychoanalytical painting where the elongated being in the foreground penetrates what was apparently a real landscape, until it tears like a backdrop; another painting, Forum of Inward-turned Optics (1948; Vienna, Hist. Mus.), is evidence of his ability to depict the subject in a realist style while simultaneously overturning the laws of one-point perspective.

He married his second wife, Hermine Jedliczka, in 1951; their daughter Xenia Hausner, also an artist, was born the same year. After working on the painting for six years, he completed his masterpiece, The Ark of Odysseus, in 1956. The Ark of Odysseus (1948–51 and 1953-6; Vienna, Hist. Mus.), depicts the hero as a self-portrait and was a precursor to the series of Adam paintings in which Hausner painted his own features.

== Conflict with the Surrealists and later life ==
In 1957, Hausner painted his first "Adam" picture. He came into conflict with the Surrealist orthodoxy, who condemned his attempt to give equal importance to both conscious and unconscious processes in the artistic creation.

In 1959, he was a participant in the II. documenta in Kassel. In the same year, Rudolf Hausner exhibited for the first time in a group exhibition at the Österreichische Galerie Belvedere in Vienna. Numerous international exhibitions followed. In addition, Rudolf Hausner gave lectures and accepted guest lecturer positions in Hamburg and Tokyo. In 1959 he co-founded the Vienna School of Fantastic Realism together with his old surrealist group members: Ernst Fuchs, Helmut Leherb, Fritz Janschka, Wolfgang Hutter, Anton Lehmden and Arik Brauer. In 1962, Hausner met Paul Delvaux, René Magritte, Victor Brauner, and Dorothea Tanning while traveling in Germany, the Netherlands, Belgium, and France. The 1st Burda Prize for Painting was awarded to him in 1967. In 1969, he was awarded the Prize of the City of Vienna. Shortly after, he separated from Hermine Jedliczka and moved to Hietzing together with his daughter Xenia and Anne Wolgast, whom he had met in Hamburg.

From 1966 until 1980, he was a guest professor at the Hochschule für bildende Künste Hamburg. He also taught at the Academy of Fine Arts Vienna since 1968. Among his students were Oz Almog, Joseph Bramer, Friedrich Hechelmann, Gottfried Helnwein, F. Scott Hess, Michael Engelhardt, and Siegried Goldberger. Hausner was awarded the Austrian State Prize for Painting in 1970. He also designed postage stamps for the Austrian Post and the United Nations Postal Administration.

A characteristic of his painting technique is the use of translucent ("glazing") resin oil paints in more than ten layers on top of each other over underpainting of acrylic paints, which gives the paint a special luminous depth. He also developed methods to create flawless transitions in pure oil painting without the use of an airbrush.

== Bibliography ==
- R. Hausner, Adam und Anima (exh. cat., Bad Frankenhausen, Panorama Mus., 1994)

== Sources ==
- Die Wiener Schule des Phantastischen Realismus (exh. cat., Hannover, Kestner-Ges., 1965)
- W. Schmied: Rudolf Hausner (Salzburg, 1970)
- V. Huber, ed.: Rudolf Hausner: Werkzeichnis der Druckgraphik von 1966 bis 1975 (Offenbach am Main, 1977)
- H. Hollander: Rudolf Hausner Werkmonographie (Offenbach am Main, 1985)
