= De Es Schwertberger =

Austrian artist

De Es Schwertberger (born Dieter Schwertberger, 1942), commonly known simply as De Es (since 1972), is an Austrian artist, painter and modeller. His work has been shown in exhibitions in New York City, where he lived for a short time, and Switzerland.

== Biography ==
De Es was born in 1942 in Gresten, Lower-Austria, as Dieter Schwertberger, the second son of two teachers. His father died during World War II, leaving his mother to raise him and his elder brother. He graduated from the Engineering School of Vienna in 1962, aged 19.

His first decade as an artist began when he was taught to paint by Ernst Fuchs, in the style of the 'Technique of the Old Masters' from 1963 onwards. These initial paintings were shown to the world in a one-man-show in the gallery of Professor Fuchs, in Vienna 1964. After this exhibition he went on to further study, and modify, the 'Techniques of the Old Masters' to his own purposes in a selection of work he called Ideas of Truth, and his portfolio The Missing Weapon, which was shown at the Gallery Bernard in Solothurn, Switzerland, in 1968. He then went on to further develop his art technique, with shows in Switzerland from 1968 to 1972. During his time there he met and exhibited with H.R. Giger.

In 1973 De Es went on to serve as the assistant to Ernst Fuchs, at the Summer Academy in Reichenau. It was during this time that De Es went through the Stone Period, in which his artwork consisted mainly of objects and people made from cracked rock and stone (such as his famous 'triptych' painting The Joining, later displayed in SoHo, New York City for an entire year in 1977). During this period, he held a series of exhibitions in Vienna and elsewhere in Europe, as well as published his book, Fundamental Images.

De Es moved to SoHo, New York City in 1975, continuing his Stone Period of art work. In the 1979 he opened his own Gallery, Studio Planet Earth, before ending the Stone Period with a series of 'Time-Portals' paintings. While in New York he came into contact with Alex Grey.

De Es's 1980s period of work opened with his work on the vast Transformation cycle of paintings, depicting 'Planetarians' (fictional beings invented by De Es), which were displayed at the Dome of Peace exhibition in 1980. This was followed by the publishing of his post-card book, Sharing the light in 1983. Three years later, in 1986, De Es returned to Austria, the same year in which Sphinx Verlag published the book The Philosopher's Stone in Basel. This book contained images and work from Fundamental Images. He ended his 1980s period of work with his first Planetarian sculptures, from 1987 to 1989, and the publication of his Dome of Peace works in an artwork portfolio.

In the early 1990s he continued with the Planetarian sculptures, with an outdoor exhibition of forty Planetarians at Gurten Mountain, near Bern, marking the 800th anniversary of the city. In 1993 he published his book Heavy Light, a selection of his work from throughout his life. He also started work on another book, Prime Matter, which covered his Stone Period, which was published over the following years.

De Es called the period from 1990 till 2000 the Skin of the Earth'. Nature, Structure and Wave became major themes of this period. A Retrospektive in the Chateau Gruyeres, Switzerland featured these works in 1989.

To celebrate the new millennium De Es produced another 100 Planetarians which appeared on a mountain site next to Vienna during the summer of 2000. As the result of the process of painting the Planetarian Sculptures', emerges a new dynamic style which focused on streaming energy-patterns and elemental space-systems which he calls Architexturen. 2003 he published a portfolio of digital Graphics, the Digi-Tales. Oneman exhibition in the Viennese Palais Palffy in 2007 and publication of the book Architexturen.

Surprisingly in 2015 De Es Schwertberger started to animate the theme of the Stoneman again in the painting series Neolithics.

De Es shows his works permanently in the Sinnreich', his museum and gallery in Vienna, Austria.

== Art work ==
- 1960s. This period is called Lightsearch by De Es. It involved work based on that of the Old Masters, which he used to his own purposes.
- 1970s. This period of work is called The Stone and Light by De Es. In this period he developed his Stone Period technique of painting pictures of beings and objects made from cracked stone and rock.
- 1980s. This period of work is called Transformation by De Es. During this time he went on to further develop his work, replacing the 'Stone' objects in his paintings, from the Stone Period, with images of people and objects made from light.
- 1990s. This period is called The Skin of the Earth by De Es. De Es created Planetarian sculptures and paintings during this time, characterised by his exhibition of 40 'Planetarians' in Switzerland.

== See also ==
- Ernst Fuchs (artist) De Es's mentor
- Fantastic realism School of art
- Vienna School of Fantastic Realism as a student of Fuchs De Es is of the 2nd generation

== Bibliography ==
- 1974 – Die Wiener Schule des Phantastischen Realismus (C. Bertelsmann) (Johann Muschik) ISBN 3-570-06123-X (German Language)
- 1986 – The Philosopher's Stone (Sphinx Verlag)
- 1993 – Heavy Light (the art of De Es) (Morpheus International) ISBN 0-9623447-8-8
- 2007 – Metamorphosis (beinArt) ISBN 978-0-9803231-0-8
- 2007 – De Es Schwertberger – Architexturen Malerei 1992 bis 2007 (Gezeiten Verlag & Kommunikation) ISBN 978-3-9502272-6-0 (German Language)
