= Arik Brauer =

Austrian painter, singer-songwriter, architect, and teacher (1929–2021)

- אריק בראואר
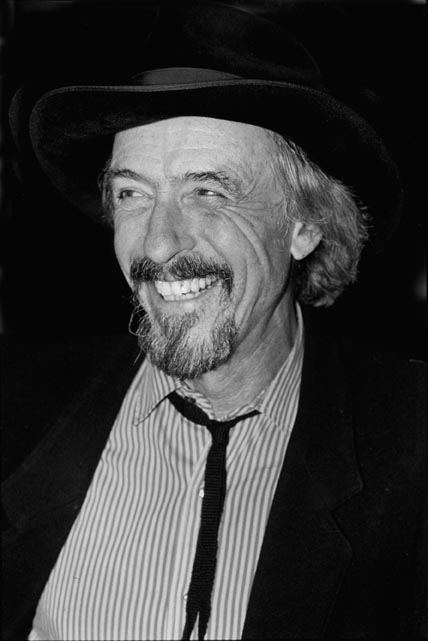
- Arik Brauer at the Galerie Latal in Zürich in 1991
- Born: Erich Brauer; 4 January 1929; Vienna, Austria
- Died: 24 January 2021 (aged 92); Vienna, Austria
- Education: Academy of Fine Arts Vienna
- Occupations: Painter; Singer-songwriter; Architect; Academic teacher
- Organization: Academy of Fine Arts Vienna
- Known for: Vienna School of Fantastic Realism; Austropop
- Spouse: Naomi Dahabani (m. 1957)
- Children: 3
- Awards: Austrian Cross of Honour for Science and Art; Amadeus Austrian Music Awards

Arik Brauer (Hebrew: אריק בראואר; 4 January 1929 – 24 January 2021) was an Austrian painter, printmaker, poet, dancer, singer-songwriter, stage designer, architect, and academic teacher.

Brauer, from a family of Jewish emigrants, grew up in Vienna under the Nazi regime. After World War II, he studied at the Academy of Fine Arts Vienna from age 16, and from 1947 also singing. He travelled extensively, and married in Israel in 1957, settling in Paris where he formed a singing duo with his wife. From 1963, they lived in Ein Hod, Israel, and in Vienna. Brauer was a co-founder of the Vienna School of Fantastic Realism. Called an Universalkünstler (all-round artist) in Austria, he appeared as a singer-songwriter at the beginning of Austropop in the 1970s, taught at the Academy of Fine Arts Vienna from 1985, and designed buildings in Austria and Israel in the 1990s.

His art was exhibited at international galleries and museums, and especially at major museums in Vienna, a graphic retrospective at the Albertina in 1974, at the Österreichische Galerie Belvedere in 1976, the Jewish Museum in New York in 1978, and an exhibition travelling the world (Weltwanderausstellung) from 1979 to 1983. A cycle of illustrations of the Haggadah was shown at the Jewish Museum Vienna in 2014, a retrospective at the Leopold Museum the same year, and Alle meine Künste, a documentation of the development in the context of his biography at the Jewish Museum in 2019 on the occasion of his 90th birthday. Among many awards are the Austrian Cross of Honour for Science and Art (2002), the Amadeus Austrian Music Award for his lifetime achievement (2015), and the Decoration of Honour for Services to the Republic of Austria (2018).

== Career ==
Erich Brauer was born in Vienna, the child of Lithuanian Jewish emigrants. His father worked as a craftsman in Vienna-Ottakring. He remembered living in a "one room-kitchen apartment with a toilet in the corridor". As a child, he showed a gift for drawing, with motifs taken from street life, woods and garden, and characters from books, including the Torah. Ernst Fuchs, described him as "a mystic, a romantic whose realm of experience grew through approaching experiences of nature". After school, he was a carpenter apprentice, in a Social Democratic environment. Brauer survived the end of World War II hidden in a garden colony, whereas his father was murdered in a Nazi concentration camp.

After the war, Brauer joined the Free Austrian Youth, the Austrian Communist Party's youth organization. He was engaged there for culture and social life, leading a choir, making drawings for the youth newspaper and organising sports. When he soon realised that his focus was not politics he turned to art, away from communism. He studied at the Academy of Fine Arts Vienna from 1945, supervised by Albert Paris von Gütersloh and Herbert Boeckl. From 1947 to 1951 he studied singing at the Musikschule der Stadt Wien (later: Music and Arts University of the City of Vienna). In 1949 he moved to Paris for the first time, and a year later he toured North Africa by bike. Brauer dated his works from 1954, when he officially completed his studies. Brauer then lived as a singer and dancer in Israel and appeared in 1956 as a dancer in the Raimund Theater in Vienna. Gütersloh promoted Brauer's work within the Vienna School of Fantastic Realism circle of artists, which had formed in the mid-1950s from a post-1946 Viennese surrealist group which included Brauer along with Edgar Jené, Ernst Fuchs, Maître Leherb (Helmut Leherb), Wolfgang Hutter, Rudolf Hausner, Anton Lehmden, and Fritz Janschka. Despite the prevailing art-world taste for abstraction in the 1950s and early 1960s, Brauer's work successfully blended high craftsmanship and surrealism in ways that gained him international attention. Among his works during this period are Vogelfang with flying mythical creatures (Fabelwesen) in 1962, Turm aus gebrannter Erde with detailed work (1962/63), and Der Regenmacher vom Karmel (The rainmaker from Carmel) in 1964, showing a colourful paradise landscape. There was a world travelling exhibition of the Vienna School of Fantastic Realism from 1963 to 1965.

After his studies, Brauer travelled the world extensively. He married Naomi Dahabani in 1957 in Israel, and they settled in Paris in 1958, where they made a living as singers (Neomi et Arik Bar-Or). They returned to Vienna in 1964. In the 1970s, Brauer was focused on singing. He wrote and performed songs in dialect such as "Sie ham a Haus baut" and "Hinter meiner, vorder meiner" which were meant as critical texts, but were recognised as early contributions to the new genre Austropop (pop music in Austrian dialect). His 1971 album Arik Bauer achieved two Goldene Schallplatte certificates. Some songs became popular Volkslieder, sung in company in wineries and alpine huts. In 1975, Brauer designed the stage sets and costumes for a production of Mozart's Die Zauberflöte at the Paris Opera.

In 1982, Brauer had breakthrough solo exhibitions in the United States (1979–85 travelling exhibition of the Brauer retrospective in the United States and numerous lectures at American universities). He taught at the Vienna Academy from 1985 to 1997.

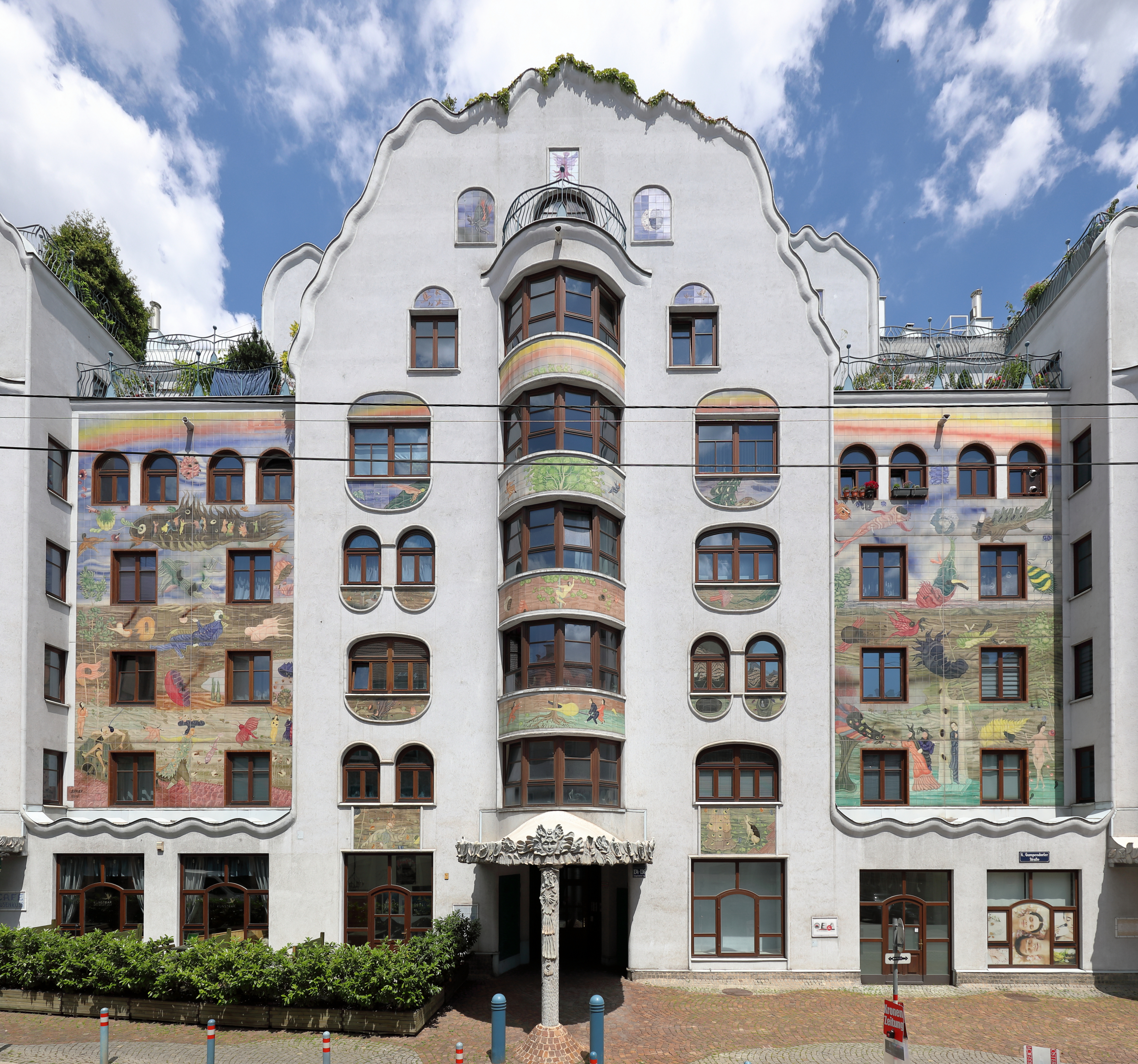
Arik-Brauer-Haus in Vienna

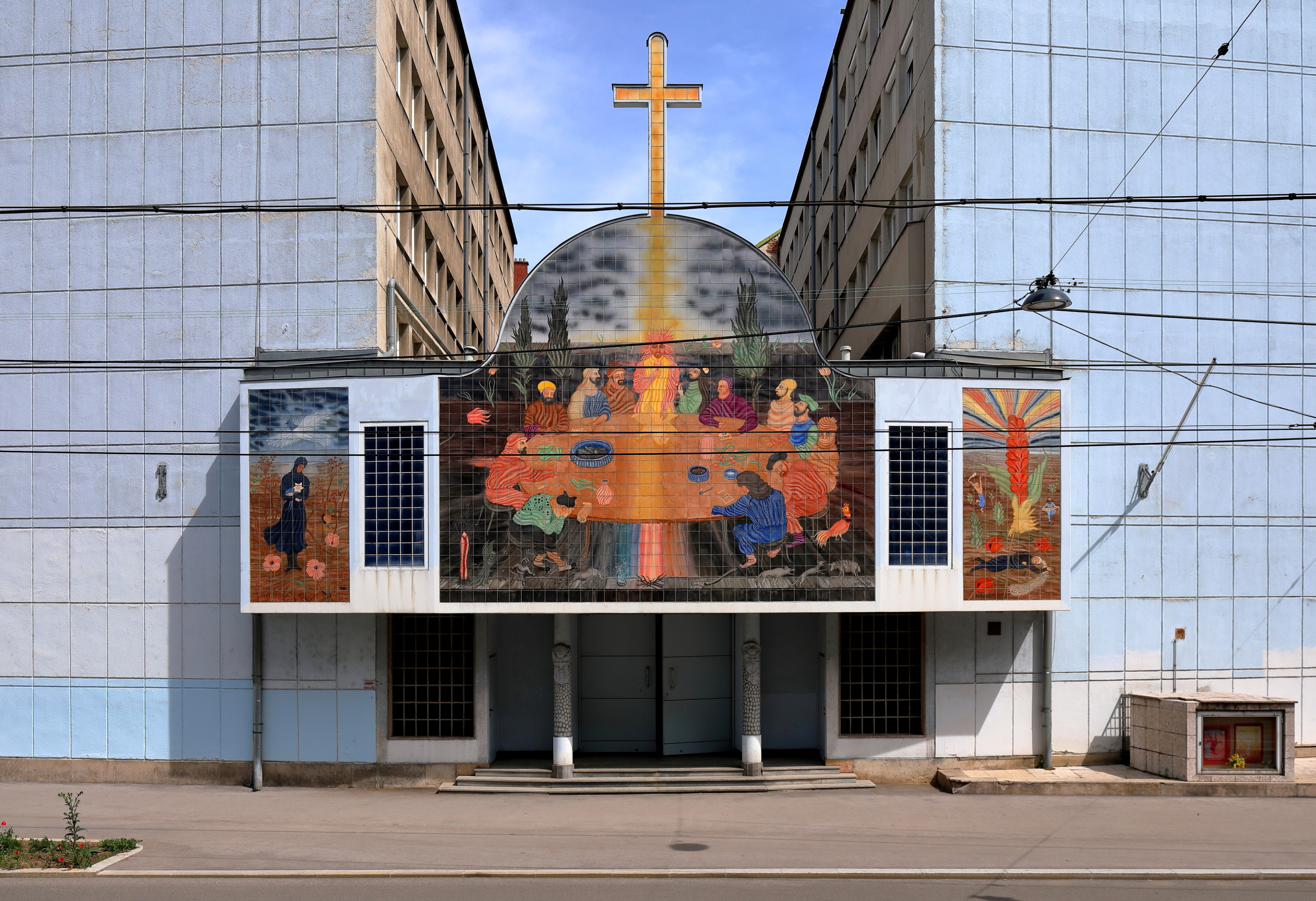
Catholic Pfarre am Tabor in Vienna in 1996

In the 1990s, Brauer turned to architecture, with projects in Austria and Israel. The facades and interiors of his buildings are covered with fantastical mosaics, murals, and painted tiles. He designed the Arik-Brauer-Haus in Gumpendorferstraße, Vienna, completed in 1993, the Catholic Pfarre am Tabor in Vienna in 1996, the Voitsberg town hall and the Kastra shopping mall in Haifa. The facade of Kastra features his Adam and Eve in the Garden of Eden, the largest mural of its kind in the world. He also designed the United Buddy Bear for Austria in 2002.

On the occasion of his 70th birthday, the Historisches Museum der Stadt Wien showed works from Brauer's private collection, including the cycle Die Verfolgung des jüdischen Volks (The persecution of the Jewish people), begun in 1973, Menschenrechte (Human rights), a 1975 cycle of etchings, stage and costume designs of Die Zauberflöte, the 1986 children's book Die Ritter von der Reuthenstopf, and the Sesam öffne dich, a 1989 television play with his daughter Timna, and designs for the Brauer House in Vienna. A retrospective of his art was presented at the Leopold Museum in 2015, entitled "Arik Brauer – Bilder des Phantastischen Realisten". He took part in several multi-media projects during the exhibition.

From 1963, Brauer lived with his wife regularly in Israel for several months in summer, in a building complex that he designed for an artist colony. One of their three daughters, Timna, is a jazz singer. On the occasion of his 90th birthday, their daughter Ruth Brauer-Kvam wrote a play about his life, Arik. Die wunderbar realistische Welt des phantastischen Herrn Brauer, for which he designed the stage sets. She sang and recited from his texts and memories. The Jewish Museum in Vienna dedicated an exhibition to him on the occasion which attracted 54,000 visitors. Titled All of My Arts, it presented his art in the context of his biography, in photographies, correspondence, posters and furniture juxtaposed with paintings, sculpture and costumes.

On 24 January 2021, Brauer died in Vienna at age 92. He was cremated at Feuerhalle Simmering, his ashes were buried in Vienna Central Cemetery.

== Exhibitions ==
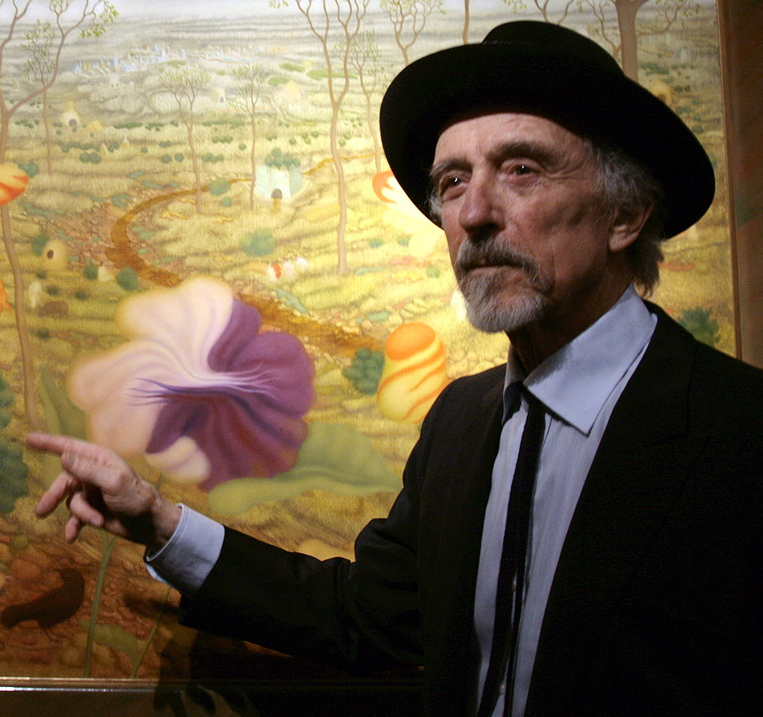
Arik Brauer in 2009

Source: Homepage and Belvedere Archive.

- "Die Hundsgruppe" — first group exhibition, Vienna 1951
- Galerie Raymond Cordier, Paris 1961
- Galerie Flinker, Paris 1964
- Galerie Ketterer, Munich 1966
- Galerie 3+2, Paris 1969
- Museum des 20. Jahrhunderts, Vienna 1970
- Marlborough Galerie, Zürich, 1973
- Aberbach Fine Art, New York
- Biberbach Fine Art, New York 1976
- Aoki-Galerie, Tokyo 1976
- Österreichische Galerie Belvedere, Vienna 1976
- Die Zauberflöte, Galerie Octave Negru, Paris 1977
- Galerie Facchetti, Paris
- Aberbach Fine Art, London 1977
- Jewish Museum, New York 1978
- Goldman's Art Gallery, Haifa 1980
- Brauer — Das graphische Werk, several internal locations 1974–1983
- Graphik-Retrospektive, Albertina, Vienna 1974
- Brauer Retrospective, Jewish Museum, New York 1979
- several international locations (Weltwanderausstellung) 1979–1983
- Galerie Rolandseck, Bonn 1986
- Jack Rutberg Fine Arts, Los Angeles 1989
- Galerie Georges & Lesaar, Düsseldorf 1991
- Galerie Weihergut, Salzburg 1991
- Schloß Burgau, 1997
- Arik Brauer – Schiess' nicht auf die blaue Blume...!, KunstHausWien 11 September 2003 – 1 February 2004
- Arik Brauer "Tierisch – Menschlich", Galerie Weihergut, Salzburg 7 December 2013 – 15 February 2014
- Arik Brauers neue Pessach-Haggada, Jewish Museum Vienna 22 January – 25 May 2014
- Arik Brauer Gesamt.Kunst.Werk, Leopold Museum, Vienna 14 November 2014 – 16 February 2015
- Einfach phantastisch, Schloss, Riegersburg 29 April 2015 – 15 November 2015
- Wir Wegbereiter. Pioniere der Nachkriegsmoderne, MUMOK, Vienna 12 May 2016 – 26 February 2017
- Arik Brauer. Alle meine Künste, Jewish Museum Vienna 3 April 2019 – 20 October 2019
- The Beginning. Kunst in Österreich 1945 bis 1980, Albertina modern in Künstlerhaus Wien 27 May 2020 – 2 November 2020

== Writings ==
- Arik Brauer: Das Runde fliegt: Texte, Lieder, Bilder (Munich, 1983)
- Arik Brauer: Werkverzeichnis, 3 vols (Dortmund, 1984)

== Awards ==
- City of Vienna Prize for Visual Arts (1979)
- Golden Medal of Honour for Services to the City of Vienna (1989)
- Austrian Cross of Honour for Science and Art, (1st class) (2002)
- Ehrenzeichen für Verdienste um das Land Wien (Decoration of Honor for Services to the State of Vienna) (2011)
- Amadeus Austrian Music Awards, Lifetime Achievement (2015)
- Decoration of Honour for Services to the Republic of Austria, Grand Decoration of Honour in Gold (2018)
- Fritz Csoklich Prize (2019)
