= Ernst Fuchs (artist) =

Austrian artist (1930–2015)

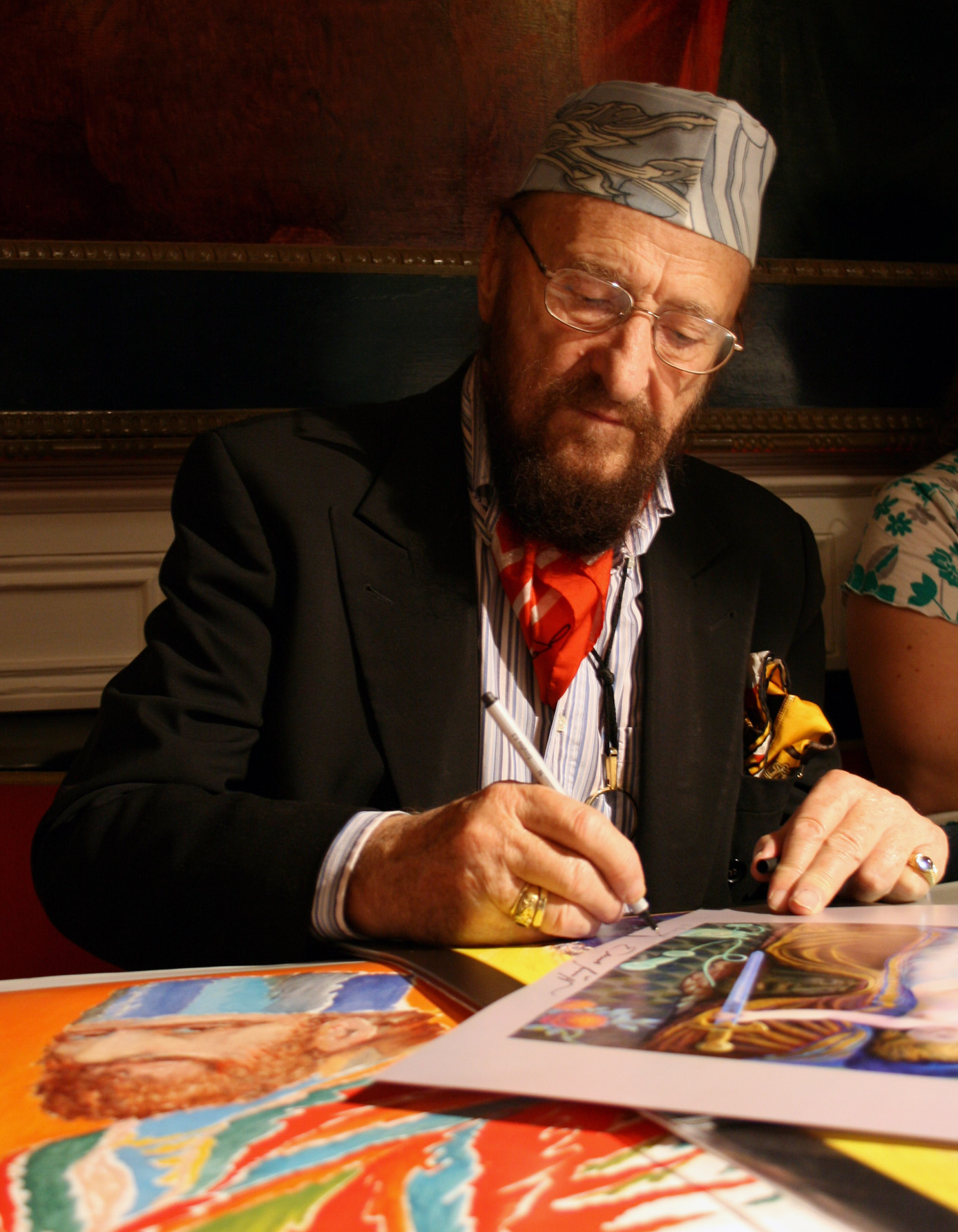
- Fuchs in 2007
- Born: 13 February 1930; Vienna
- Died: 9 November 2015 (aged 85); Vienna
- Education: St. Anna Painting School; Academy of Fine Arts Vienna
- Known for: Painting
- Movement: Vienna School of Fantastic Realism
- Children: 16

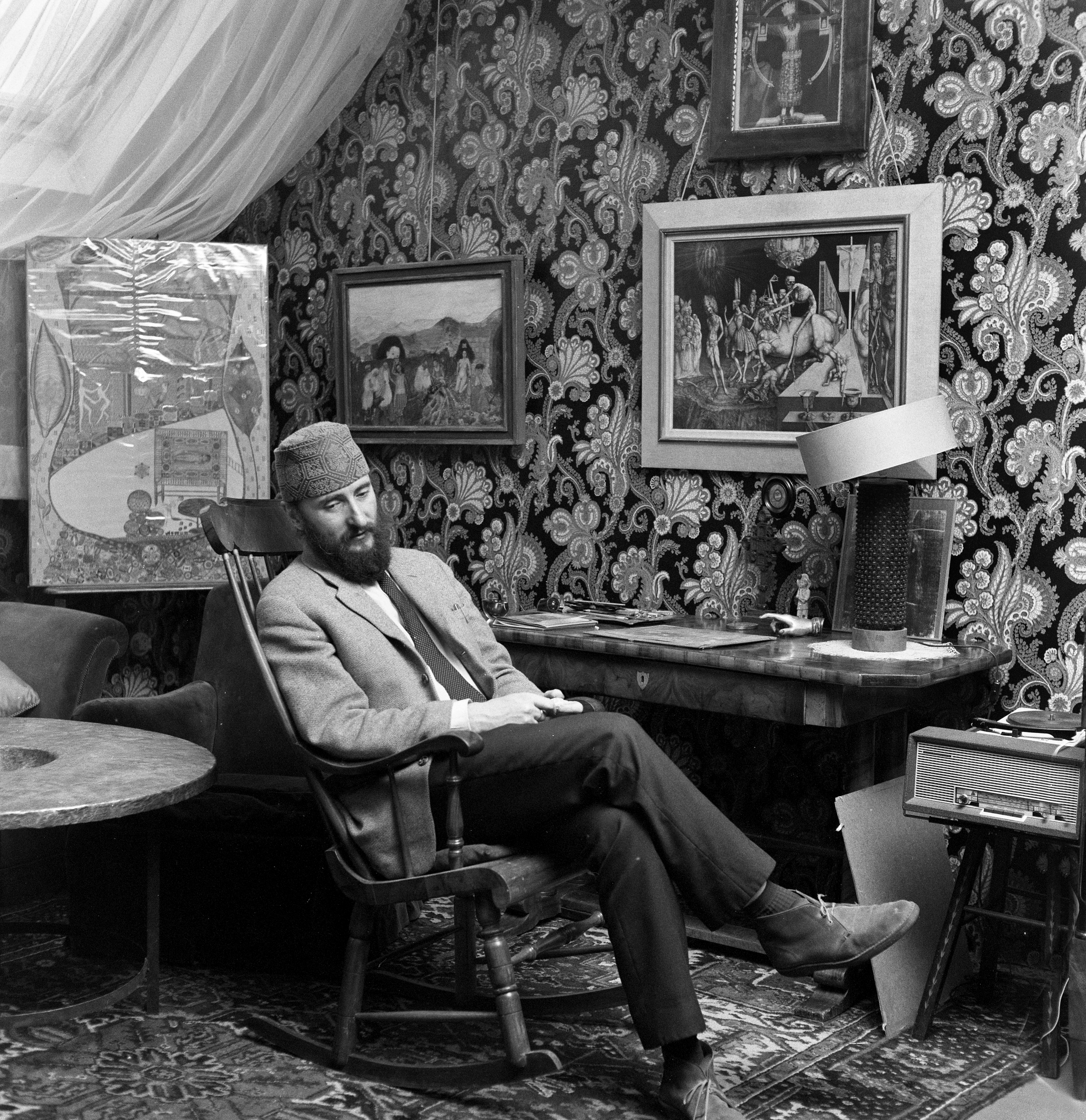
Ernst Fuchs 1973.

Ernst Fuchs (13 February 1930 – 9 November 2015) was an Austrian painter, draftsman, printmaker, sculptor, architect, stage designer, composer, poet, and one of the founders of the Vienna School of Fantastic Realism. In 1972, he acquired the derelict Otto Wagner Villa in Hütteldorf, which he restored and transformed. The villa was inaugurated as the Ernst Fuchs Museum in 1988.

== Education ==
Born in Vienna into a Jewish family, the only child of Maximilian and Leopoldine Fuchs, Fuchs attended the St. Anna Painting School, where he studied under Fritz Fröhlich (1944). He entered the Academy of Fine Arts Vienna (1945), where he began his studies under Professor Robin Christian Andersen, later moving to the class of Albert Paris von Gütersloh.

== Career ==
At the Academy, he met Arik Brauer, Rudolf Hausner, Helmut Leherb, Fritz Janschka, Wolfgang Hutter, and Anton Lehmden, together with whom he later founded what has become known as the Vienna School of Fantastic Realism. He was also a founding member of the Art-Club (1946), as well as the Hundsgruppe, set up in opposition to it in 1951, together with Friedensreich Hundertwasser and Arnulf Rainer.

Fuchs' work of this period was influenced by the art of Gustav Klimt and Egon Schiele and then by Max Pechstein, Heinrich Campendonk, Edvard Munch, Henry Moore and Pablo Picasso. During this time, seeking to achieve the vivid lighting effects achieved by such Old Masters as Albrecht Altdorfer, Albrecht Dürer, Matthias Grünewald and Martin Schongauer, he revived and adopted the mischtechnik (mixed technique) of painting. In the mischtechnik, egg tempera is used to build up volume, and is then glazed with oil paints mixed with resin, producing a jewel-like effect.

Between 1950 and 1961, Fuchs lived mostly in Paris, and made a number of journeys to the United States and Israel. His favourite reading material at the time was the sermons of Meister Eckhart. He also studied the symbolism of the alchemists and read Jung's Psychology and Alchemy. His favourite examples at the time were the mannerists, especially Jacques Callot, and he was also very much influenced by Jan van Eyck and Jean Fouquet. In 1958 he founded the Galerie Fuchs-Fischoff in Vienna to promote and support the younger painters of the Fantastic Realism school. Together with Friedensreich Hundertwasser and Arnulf Rainer, he founded the Pintorarium.

When he was 12 years old, he converted to Roman Catholicism (his mother had him baptized during the war in order to save him from being sent to a concentration camp). In 1957, he entered the Dormition Abbey on Mount Zion where he began work on his monumental Last Supper and devoted himself to producing small-sized paintings on religious themes such as Moses and the Burning Bush, culminating in a commission to paint three altar paintings on parchment, the cycle of the Mysteries of the Holy Rosary (1958–61), for the Rosenkranzkirche in Hetzendorf, Vienna. He also dealt with contemporary issues in his masterpiece of this period, Psalm 69 (1949–60). (Fuchs, 1978, p. 53).

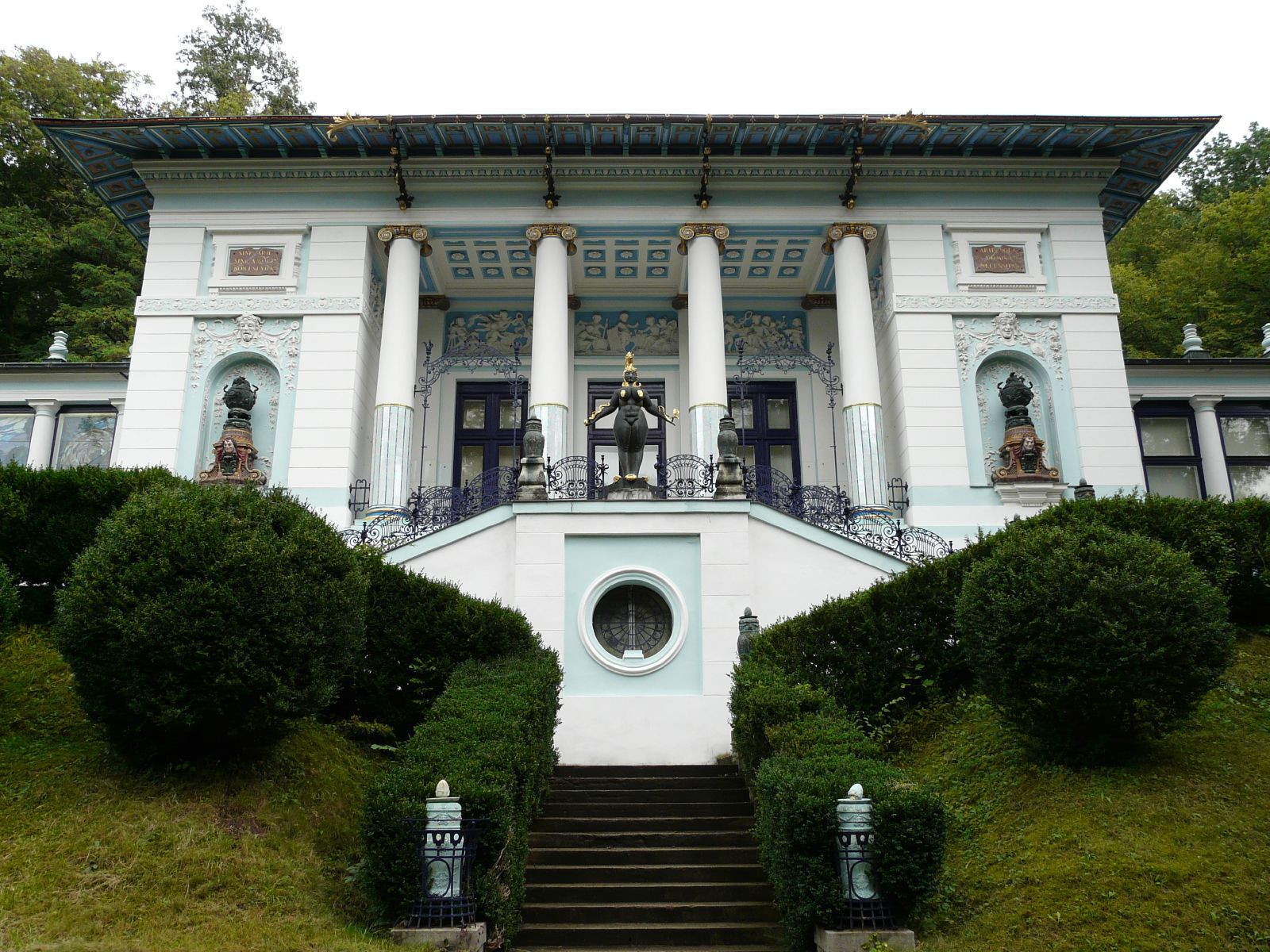
Exterior

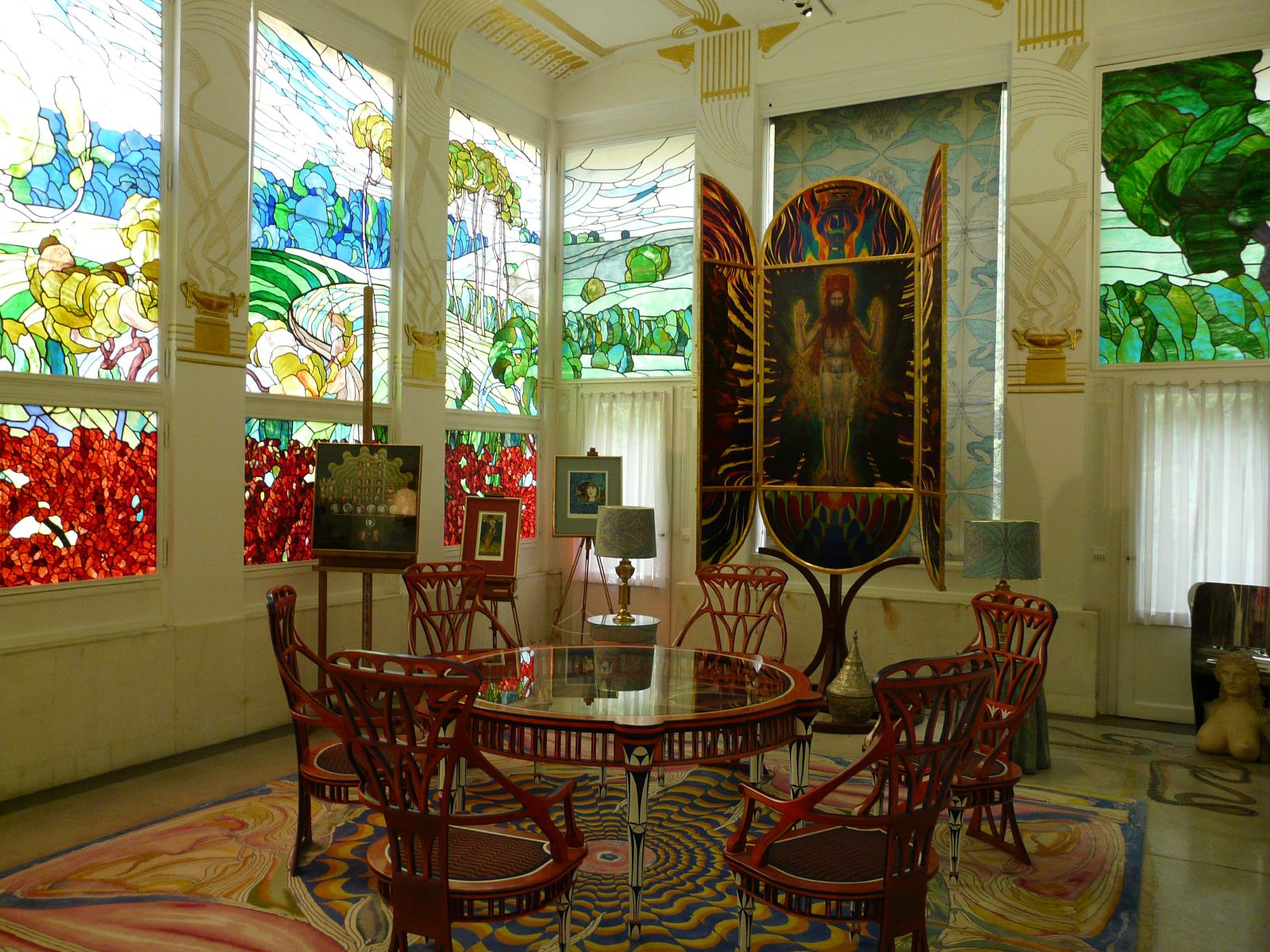
Interior

Wagner Villa

Fuchs returned to Vienna in 1961 and had a vision of what he called the verschollener Stil (Hidden Prime of Styles), the theory of which he set forth in his book Architectura Caelestis: Die Bilder des verschollenen Stils (Salzburg, 1966). He also produced several important cycles of prints, such as Unicorn (1950–52), Samson (1960–64), Esther (1964–67) and Sphinx (1966–67; all illustrated in Weis). In 1972, he acquired the derelict Otto Wagner Villa in Hütteldorf, which he restored and transformed. The villa was inaugurated as the Ernst Fuchs Museum in 1988.

From 1970 on, Fuchs embarked on numerous sculptural projects such as Queen Esther (h. 2.63 m, 1972), located at the entrance to the museum, and also mounted on the radiator cap of the Cadillac at the entrance to the Dalí Museum in Figueres, Catalonia, Spain.

== Design projects ==
From 1974, he became involved in designing stage sets and costumes for the operas of Mozart and Richard Wagner, including Die Zauberflöte, Parsifal, and Lohengrin. He experimented with industrial design in the 1970s with a 500-piece run of the upscale Suomi tableware by Timo Sarpaneva that Fuchs decorated for the German Rosenthal porcelain maker's Studio Linie.

In 1993, Fuchs was given a retrospective exhibition at the State Russian Museum in St. Petersburg, one of the first Western artists so honored.

== Personal life and death ==
Fuchs had 16 children.

He was an Austrian monarchist. His son Emanuel revealed after his death: "My father advocated the reintroduction of the monarchy because he thought it was the better form of government."

Fuchs died in Vienna's Sophienspital at the age of 85 on 9 November 2015.

== Decorations and awards ==
- 1972: City of Vienna Prize for Visual Arts
- 2000: Officier dans l’Ordre des Arts et des Lettres
- 2009: Austrian Cross of Honour for Science and Art, 1st class
- 2010: Grand Decoration of Carinthia
- 2010: Golden Medal of Honour for Services to the city of Vienna

== Publications ==
- Architectura caelestis: die Bilder des verschollenen Stils (Salzburg: Residenz, 1966/Pb ed., Dtv, 1973) ISBN 3-423-00865-2, OCLC 602651095
- Album der Familie Fuchs (Salzburg: Residenz, 1973) ISBN 978-3-7017-0086-8 OCLC 17632060
- Im Zeichen der Sphinx: Schriften und Bilder, ed. Walter Schurian (Munich, Dtv, 1978) ISBN 3-423-01355-9, OCLC 5942574
- Aura: Ein Märchen der Sehnsucht (Munich: Dtv, 1981) ISBN 978-3-423-02872-1, OCLC 7775837
- Der Prophet des Schönen: Arno Breker (Marco, 1982)| ISBN 3-923450-00-1, OCLC 9818767
- Von Jahwe: Gedichte (Munich, 1982) | ISBN 978-3-923450-02-2, OCLC 157021136

Other publications

- 1977 – Fuchs über Ernst Fuchs: Bilder und Zeichnungen von 1945–1976, (R.P. Hartmann Paris) ISBN 978-3-492-02283-5
- 2003 – Ernst Fuchs – Zeichnungen und Graphik aus der frühen Schaffensperiode – 1942 bis 1959. (Friedrich Haider) (Vienna: Löcker-Verlag) ISBN 3-85409-387-X
- 2005 – Fantastic Art (Taschen) (Schurian, Prof. Dr. Walter) ISBN 978-3-8228-2954-7 (English edition)
- 2006 – True Visions (Erik Davis and Pablo Echaurren) (Betty Books) ISBN 88-902372-0-1
- 2007 – Metamorphosis (beinArt) ISBN 978-0-9803231-0-8
- 2008 – Phantastischer Realismus (Belvedere, Wien) ISBN 978-3-901508-44-8

== See also ==
- Zvi Malnovitzer, a student of Ernst Fuchs
- De Es Schwertberger, a student of Ernst Fuchs
- Fantastic Realism School of art
- Society for the Art of Imagination
- Visionary Art

== Sources ==
- Ernst Fuchs: Zeichnungen und Graphiken, (Ketterer-Kunst, 1967)
- H. Weis, ed.: Ernst Fuchs: Das graphische Werk (Vienna, 1967)
- Ernst Fuchs: Homage à Böcklin, (Frankf./Main/Geneva/Vienna, 1971)
- Ernst Fuchs: oeuvre gravé (Friburg: Musee d'art et d'histoire, 1975)
- Fuchs über Ernst Fuchs: Bilder und Zeichnungen von 1945–1976, ed. R. P. Hartmann (Paris, 1977)
- Ernst Fuchs: Arbeiten für der Hamburger Staatsoper, (Hamburg 1977)
- R. P. Hartmann, ed.: Ernst Fuchs: Das graphische Werk, 1967–1980 (Munich, 1980)
- Ernst Fuchs: Bildalchemie, (Osnabrück: Kulturgesichtliches Mus., c1981)
- Gedichte von Jahwe (Munich: R. P. Hartmann, 1982)
- U. Hotzy, Ernst Fuchs: die Werke aus den Jahren im Ausland (Salzburg, Univ., Diss., 1982)
- Fuchs Graphik: Sydows Katalog einer idealen Sammlung, ed., Heinrich v. Sydow-Zirkwitz (Berlin: Studio 69, 1983)
- Planeta Caelestis (Berlin and Munich, 1987)
- Der Feuerfuchs, ed. R. P. Hartmann (Frankf./Main: Umschau Verlag, 1988)
- Ernst Fuchs und Wein, (Landau/Pfalz: Verein Südliche Weinstrasse, 1995)
- Der Maler mit den 16 Kindern, (Die Welt, 4 November 2001)
