= Vienna School of Fantastic Realism =

20th century group of artists

The Vienna School of Fantastic Realism (German: Wiener Schule des Phantastischen Realismus) is a group of artists founded in Vienna in 1946. The group's name was coined in the 1950s by Johann Muskik, and the first exhibition was in 1959 at the Belvedere, Vienna. This Austrian movement has similarities to Surrealism in its use of religious and esoteric symbolism and also the choice of a naturalistic style, countering the prevalence of abstract art movements at the time.

Artists include Ernst Fuchs, Maître Leherb (Helmut Leherb), Arik Brauer, Wolfgang Hutter, Anton Lehmden, Fritz Janschka, and Israeli artist Zeev Kun, all students of Professor Albert Paris Gütersloh at the Vienna Academy of Fine Arts. Gütersloh's emphasis on the techniques of the Old Masters gave the "fantastic realist" painters a grounding in realism, similar to early Flemish artists such as Jan van Eyck.

Some older members of the group, including Rudolf Hausner, Kurt Regschek and Fritz Janschka, emigrated to the US in 1949, where Regschek helped organize the early exhibitions of the group in 1965. Hausner, Fuchs, Hutter, Brauer and Lehmden were referred to as "The Big Five" who subsequently held exhibitions internationally.

== Books ==
- 1974: Die Wiener Schule des Phantastischen Realismus (C. Bertelsmann) (Johann Muschik) ISBN 3-570-06123-X (in German)
- 2005: Fantastic Art (Taschen)(Schurian, Prof. Dr. Walter) ISBN 978-3-8228-2954-7 (English edition)
- 2003: Die Phantasten – Die Wiener Schule des Phantastischen Realisums (Stdtgemeinde Tulln) (in German)
- 2007: Metamorphosis (beinArt) ISBN 978-0-9803231-0-8
- 2008: Phantastischer Realismus (Belvedere, Wien) ISBN 978-3-901508-44-8 (in German)

== See also ==
- Visionary art
