= Fritz Janschka =

Austrian-American painter

Fritz Janschka (1919 – April 30, 2016) was an Austrian artist and founding member of the Viennese painting school of Fantastic Realism. His work is included in the Museum of Fantastic Realism in Vienna.

Janschka moved to the United States in 1949.
