= Laurence Caruana =

Maltese artist (born 1962)

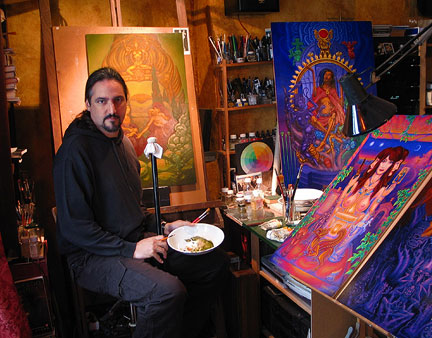
- Caruana in his Bastille studio in 2004.
- Born: February 16, 1962 (age 64); Toronto, Canada
- Education: University of Toronto
- Known for: Painting, writing, lecturing
- Movement: Visionary art, Psychedelic art
- Spouse: Florence Ménard Cuepaliztli
- Website: www.lcaruana.com

Laurence Caruana (born February 16, 1962) is a Maltese artist, writer, and lecturer known for his contribution to the contemporary Visionary Art movement, particularly through his Manifesto of Visionary Art. His works have also contributed to the revival of Gnosticism in modern times.

== Biography ==
Laurence Caruana was born the third son of Maltese parents who met and married in Toronto, Canada. After completing his studies in German and Ancient Greek Philosophy (B.A. Hons. from the University of Toronto - 1985), he attended the Academy of Fine Arts Vienna in 1987.

The artist relocated to Europe in 1990, where he began an itinerant existence - living variously in Malta, Munich, Paris, Monaco, and Vienna. In that period, he actively pursued visionary experience through dreaming, entheogens and image-meditation (theoria). At the age of 33, he had a transformational experience with entheogens and Visionary Art, which he later described as entering through the image.

In Munich, Caruana met the French artist and dancer Florence Ménard Cuepaliztli. The couple moved to Paris in 1996, sharing a studio in the Bastille quarter for twelve years. Upon meeting Professor Ernst Fuchs (artist), co-founder of The Vienna School of Fantastic Realism, the couple moved to Monaco in 2001. Caruana apprenticed under the Viennese master for a year, assisting him in his studios in Monaco and Castillon France, as well as The Apocalypse Chapel in Klagenfurt Austria.

Back in Paris, Caruana's frequent lectures, publications and exhibitions made him a significant contributor to the Visionary Art movement. In 2009, the couple moved to the Bourgogne region of France while maintaining a studio in Paris. They then relocated to Vienna in 2013 to found The Vienna Academy of Visionary Art. The artist currently lives between Vienna and Burgundy - frequently traveling abroad to exhibit, lecture and teach.

== Painting ==
After apprenticing with Ernst Fuchs, Caruana began using the Mischtechnik, a classical painting technique which alternates between water-based whites (mixed in egg tempera or casein) and color glazes (in an oleo-resinous medium).

His art is highly mythological. Through fine lines, strong colors and precise rendering, his work manifests the imagery typical of visionary experience. More uniquely, his work combines Christian themes with the symbols and styles of different cultural mythologies. The purpose of this approach is elucidated on his website:

By crossing myths and iconographies, his works explore history's symbolic responses to 'the Eternal Questions' on the nature of time, the afterlife and our soul's journey through the cosmos.

Recently, the artist's visionary approach to Christian themes has focussed on the Gnostic worldview.

Caruana has exhibited his works in a variety of settings, from national museums in Paris to Transformational festivals. He has also had solo shows in Paris and Vienna (Le Pouvoir des Mythes - Paris 2012; Ad Sacrum - Vienna 2018) while exhibiting with various groups, such as EnQuête du Sacré in Paris / Sedan; Dreams & Divinities in Toledo, and Society for Art of the Imagination in London. He was Guest of Honour at Chimeria - Salon International des Arts Visionnaires in Sedan France in 2009.

== Writing ==
Due to his deep involvement with the Visionary Art movement, L. Caruana has also become one of its spokesmen. His First Manifesto of Visionary Art (published 2000, 2010 ISBN 978-0-97826373-7) received an enthusiastic response. Through his on-line Visionary Revue, he also documented the history and evolution of this international movement.

The artist's practice of image-meditation, coupled with his research into ‘the ancient image-language’ culminated in his 2008 work Enter Through the Image: The Ancient Image-Language of Myth, Art and Dreams (ISBN 978-0-9782637-2-0). Drawing upon examples from sacred and visionary art, the author demonstrates how we may think through images and eventually enter through the image to the mystical experience of Oneness or henosis. In the final chapters, various ‘iconologues’ from the ancient image-language are elucidated - how different cultural symbols may be combined and how various cultural myths may cross one another.

The artist's research into the history of painting principles culminated in his comprehensive, fully-illustrated volume: Sacred Codes: The Forgotten Principles of Painting Revived by Visionary Art (Volume One - The Drawing Stage, 2017; ISBN 978-0-9782637-6-8). Here, Caruana gives numerous examples of the principles underlying a painting's construction (e.g. the figure's pose and proportion; compositional harmony and perspective) during the drawing stage, to demonstrate his thesis that contemporary Visionary Art combines 'The Hieratic Style' (the Sacred art of the East - Egyptian, Hindu and Buddhist) with 'Our Humanist Inheritance' (the Humanist tradition of the West - Classical sculpture and Renaissance painting). Throughout the book, he illustrates this thesis with the works of four principle Visionary artists: Michelangelo, William Blake, Gustave Moreau and Ernst Fuchs (artist).

== Teaching and Lecturing ==
As a lecturer, Caruana has spoken both in academic settings (The École des Hautes Études en Sciences Sociales in Paris; The Metageum conference in Malta; The SGEM Conference in the Hofburg Palace, Vienna) and at popular events (The Ozora Festival, Hungary; The Boom Festival, Portugal). A selection of his lectures at The Vienna Academy of Visionary Art were filmed, and eventually became the foundation to his book Sacred Codes.

As a teacher, Caruana has been invited to teach image-meditation and the Mischtechnik at such venues as The Omega Institute for Holistic Studies and The Chapel of Sacred Mirrors in upstate New York. In 2008, he held the first Visions in the Mischtechnik Seminar at the eco-village of Torri Superiore, Italy. Due to the popularity of these annual seminars, he began co-teaching with other noted Visionary artists (Amanda Sage, A. Andrew Gonzalez, Maura Holden).

Eventually, the Summer Seminars at Torri Superiore led to the foundation of The Vienna Academy of Visionary Art - a full-time academy with the explicit aim:

...To revive classical techniques of painting while pursuing art as the expression of beauty, spirit and vision.

During his seven-year tenure, Caruana served as Co-Director (with Florence Ménard Cuepaliztli) and Principal Lecturer. The academy's studios, gallery and cultural space attracted students from across the globe while exploring visionary approaches to painting and offering exhibitions of the students’ work seven times a year. Due to the Global Pandemic of 2020, the Vienna Academy closed its doors, but has continued to run the original Summer Seminars at Torri Superiore Italy under the name of The Academy of Visionary Art.

== Role in the Revival of the Gnostic Worldview ==
Laurence Caruana has been called "one of the most productive contemporary Gnostics." He has contributed to the revival of Gnosticism through his three-fold activities of writing, lecturing and painting.

As an author, Caruana has explored Gnosticism both critically and creatively. In his critical study Enter Through the Image, Caruana reads the theogony of The Apocryphon of John as parallel to a mental event in which the consciousness of God (embodied in the aeons) is occluded by the passions of the soul and the appetites of the body. Gnosis is the transcendence of these passions and appetites to recognize the consciousness of God within the self.

In his novel The Hidden Passion, the author retells the life of Christ from the Gnostic standpoint. Throughout the book, familiar scenes from the Gospel narratives (the nativity, baptism, crucifixion) are retold from the Gnostic perspective, while Christ himself utters the actual sayings (logia) of the Gnostic gospels found at Nag Hammadi. According to Matthew J. Dillon, Research Associate at The Harvard Divinity School,

…his Jesus functions as a mythic paradigm for each individual's own process of reconciling the two dimensions of humanity, the body and the divine.

As Principle Lecturer at The Vienna Academy of Visionary Art, Caruana's seven-part lecture series Alchemy, Visions & Art was recorded and now appears online. One lecture in particular, The Gnostic Wordview, has garnered over 175,000 viewings on YouTube.

After the closure of The Vienna Academy of Visionary Art, Caruana laid the foundation for a new major project: The Apocryphon Chapel. With the aid of collaborators, he has begun fifteen large-scale paintings which will form the interior of a chapel, in order to depict the over-arching myth of Gnostic Christianity, as told in The Apocryphon of John.

== Publications ==
=== By L. Caruana ===
- The First Manifesto of Visionary Art (English edition 2010, Recluse, Toronto ISBN 978-0-9782637-3-7; French edition 2011, Recluse, Toronto ISBN 978-0-9782637-4-4; Portuguese edition 2013 AMORC Curitiba, Paraná-Brasil ISBN 978-85-317-0223-5).
- The Hidden Passion: A Novel of the Gnostic Christ, Based on the Nag Hammadi Texts (2007, Recluse, Toronto - ISBN 978-0-9782637-0-6).
- Enter Through the Image: The Ancient Image-Language of Myth, Art and Dreams (2008, Recluse, Toronto - ISBN 978-0-9782637-2-0).
- Sacred Codes: The Forgotten Principles of Painting Revived by Visionary Art - Volume One - The Drawing Stage (2017, Recluse, Toronto - ISBN 978-0-9782637-6-8)
- Moreau's Labyrinth: A Visual Journey Through Jupiter and Semele - Its Narrative, Composition & Philosophy (2018, Recluse, Toronto - ISBN 978-0-9782637-8-2)

=== On L. Caruana ===
- Oroc, James (2018) The New Psychedelic Revolution: The Genesis of the Visionary Age, Park Street Press ISBN 978-1-62055-662-7 pp. 371 - 372
- Mikosz, José Eliézer Arte (2014). Arte_Visionária/ Visionária - Representações Visuais Inspiradas nos Estados não Ordinários de Consciência (ENOC) Editora Prismas ISBN 978-85-8192-211-9. pp. 196 - 199
- Hester, Lisa (2023). Re-envisioning Visionary Art: An Inquiry into Analytical Psychology and Art Criticism Ph. D thesis, Technological University of the Shannon, Ireland.
- Colombo, Danielle Elise (2015) Cosmic Expressions and Spiritual Revivals within Visionary Art Honours thesis at Texas State University
- Dillon, Matthew J., (2016). Symbolic Loss, Memory, and Modernization in the Reception of Gnosticism Gnosis: Journal of Gnostic Studies I, pp. 276 – 309
