= Inscape (visual art) =

Roberto Matta's Psychological Morphology, (painted in about 1938), with its landscape-like blue sky and horizon, combined with biomorphically suggestive and fluidly interacting figures, is a good example of what Prof. Claude Cernuschi (Boston College) has identified in Matta's work as "the psychoanalytic view of the mind as a three-dimensional space: the 'inscape'."

Inscape, in visual art, is a term especially associated with certain works of Chilean artist Roberto Matta, but it is also used in other senses within the visual arts. Though the term inscape has been applied to stylistically diverse artworks, it usually conveys some notion of representing the artist's psyche as a kind of interior landscape. The word inscape can therefore be read as a kind of portmanteau, combining interior (or inward) with landscape.

== The psychological inscape: surrealist, abstract, and fantastic art ==
According to Professor Claude Cernuschi, writing in a catalogue for a Matta exhibition at Boston College (see external link below), Matta's use of the term inscape for a series of landscape-like abstract or surrealist paintings reflects "the psychoanalytic view of the mind as a three-dimensional space: the 'inscape'." The 'inscape' concept is particularly apt for Matta's works of the late 1930s. As Dawn Adès (p. 233) writes, "A series of brilliant oil paintings done during the years of his [Matta's] first association with the Surrealists explore visual metaphors for the mental landscape." And Valerie Fletcher, in Crosscurrents of Modernism (p. 241), writes that during this time Matta "created with startling mastery the paintings he called 'inscapes' or 'psychological morphologies.' " See also Miriam Basilio's essay, "Wifredo Lam's 'The Jungle' and Matta's 'Inscapes' ".

The term inscape was later taken up by the leading Australian surrealist James Gleeson, American abstract artists such as James Brooks, Jane Frank, and Mary Frank (no relation), and even a group of British fantasy artists founded by Brigid Marlin in 1961 and calling themselves the 'Inscape Group.' (The latter group may have had in mind another sense of the word 'inscape', associated with the British poet Gerard Manley Hopkins. See the article titled simply 'inscape' for more information on this.) More recently, in a 1998 review of a Mary Frank exhibition in New York City (cited below), Carol Diehl writes, "Titled 'Inscapes', the paintings are landscapes of the soul...."

Also clearly referring to the psychoanalytical meaning of the word as described by Prof. Cernuschi and others above, the leading journal of art therapy was formerly called simply Inscape. The journal is now called International journal of art therapy : Inscape. (This is not to be confused with the Inscape magazine produced by Brigid Marlin's Society for Art of Imagination.)

== Architectural interiors as 'inscapes' ==
The word "inscape" is sometimes used, perhaps with a bit of poetic license, to refer to the domain of interior design, suggesting that the interior of a house or building is a kind of interior (or indoor) landscape, a counterpart to the landscape surrounding the structure. This is the sense suggested by the name of the South African interior design school Inscape Design College, which see. It could be, however, that this use of the term is intended as a double-entendre, evoking those other meanings of "inscape".

== See also ==
- Roberto Matta
- James Gleeson
- Surrealism
- James Brooks (painter)
- Jane Frank
- Mary Frank
- Landscape art
- Brigid Marlin
- The Society for Art of Imagination (includes information on the "Inscape Group")
- Fantasy art
- Fantastic art
- Inscape (poetic term associated with Gerard Manley Hopkins)
