= Amanda Sage =

American painter (born 1978)

- Born: Amanda Sage; 19 April 1978 (age 48); Denver, Colorado, United States
- Education: Waldorf School, Michael Fuchs, Ernst Fuchs
- Known for: Painting
- Movement: Visionary art
- Website: www.amandasage.com

Amanda Sage (born April 19, 1978) is an American painter and teacher who co-founded the Academy of Visionary Art in Vienna and the Colorado Alliance for Visionary Art. She has worked internationally, training and collaborating with Ernst Fuchs and Michael Fuchs, classical artists who taught her the Mischtechnik technique.

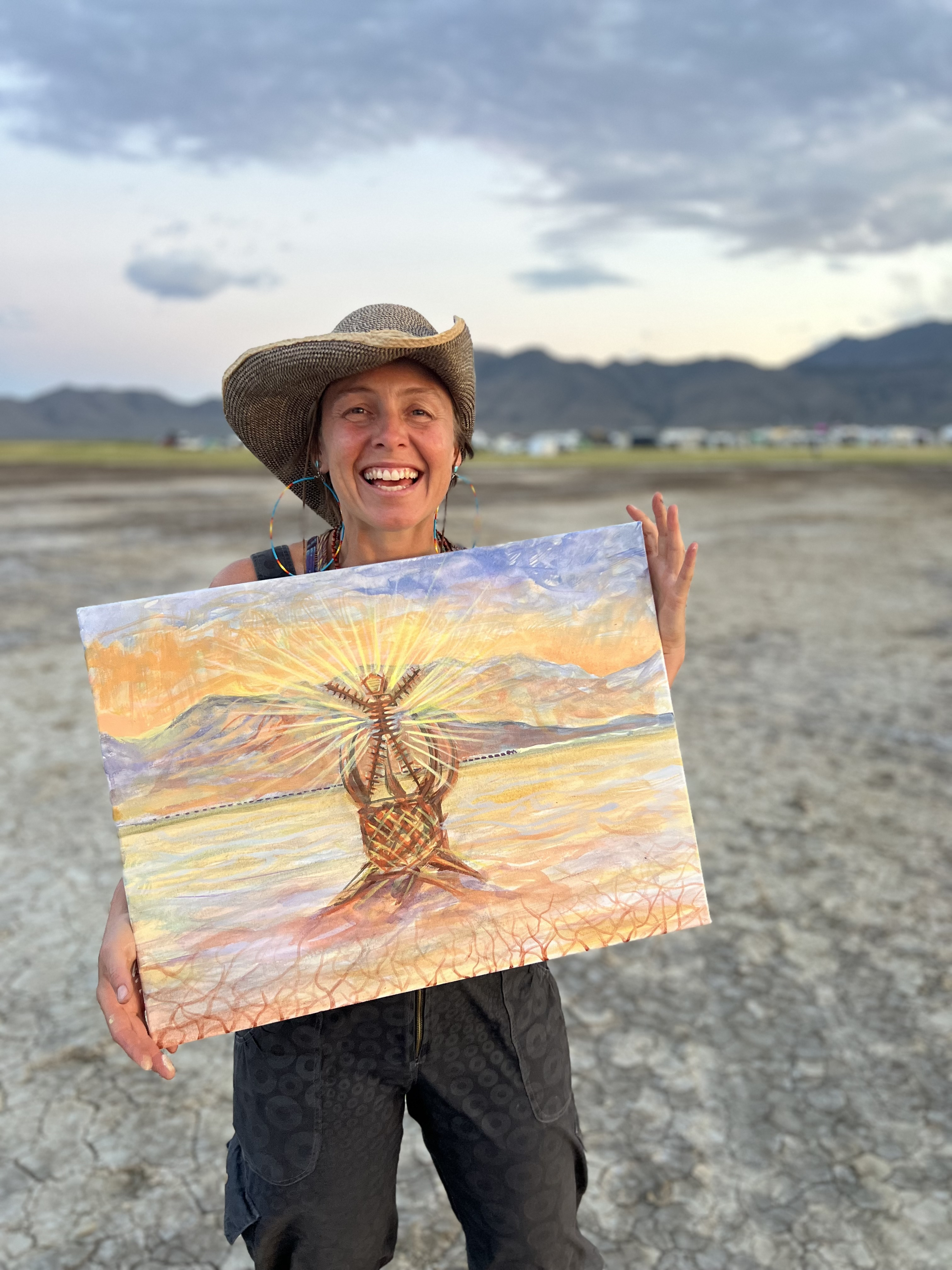
Amanda Sage and her live painting at Fly Ranch, Nevada, 2026

== Early life ==
Amanda Sage was born on 19 April 1978 in Denver, Colorado. She developed an early interest in drawing as a child, which she attributes to her home environment that actively fostered artistic activity.

Sage's family moved to Deerfield Beach, Florida during her childhood. While there, she became involved with the Unity Church. The family returned to Colorado, settling in Boulder, where Sage spent her adolescent and teenage years. She regularly practiced morning meditation at the Unity of Boulder Spiritual Center, and also engaged in Church-organized vision quests and meditative retreats.

Sage attended Shining Mountain Waldorf School, graduating in 1996. She credits her high school art teacher, Hikaru Hirata-Miyakawa, for introducing her to "semi-realism," acrylic painting, and the works of Ernst Fuchs.

== Art ==
=== Studies and early career ===
In 1997, Sage traveled to Vienna, Austria, to study classical painting with artist Michael Fuchs. She learned the Old Masters' method of Mischtechnik; Ernst Fuchs, Michael's father, had revived this style of painting in the 1950s. In 1999, after her two-year apprenticeship, Sage began working with Ernst Fuchs. She assisted Fuchs with his lifelong project in the Apocalypse Chapel in Klagenfurt, Austria, and worked with him until 2007.

In 1999 and 2000, she taught underpainting at the "Old Master, New Visions" seminar in Payerbach, Austria. The event was organized by Phil Rubinov-Jacobson, one of Ernst Fuchs's students in the 1970s.

=== Career ===
She began to exhibit her work in the United States alongside other artists beginning in 2007. She began to be represented by Galerie 10, which had also represented Ernst Fuchs, Manfred Deix, Rudolf Hausner, Helmut Kand, Anton Lehmden, Arik Brauer, and Wolfgang Hutter. Sage then moved to Los Angeles, California, where her works were exhibited at the Temple of Visions gallery.

Sage has painted live, conducted workshops, and delivered lectures at exhibitions and festivals like Inner Visions at the Boom Festival in Portugal, Palenque Norte's Burning Man, Harmonic Spaces in Australia, Art Basel Miami, and the Nexus Global Youth Summit. Her works are in galleries and salons around the world, including in Vienna, Australia, and Italy. In the United States, her works have been shown in Los Angeles, Chicago, and Colorado.

=== Visionary art organizations ===
Sage is one of ten members of the Visionary Guild who studied under Fuchs, which is part of the Vienna Academy of Visionary Art that opened in September 2013. Sage conceived the idea for the guild and worked in concert with Laurence Caruana and A. Andrew Gonzalez—whom Sage met in 2000 while working with Ernst Fuchs—to establish it. The Visionary Guild elected to base itself in Vienna because of the Vienna School of Fantastic Realism. The academy is located near Ernst Fuchs' studio, the Palais Pálffy, and the Phantasten Museum, which also showcases Sage's works.

Two other guild members, David Heskin and his wife, Aloria Weaver, later founded the Colorado Alliance of Visionary Artists (CAVA) with Sage.

On March 24, 2020 Sage plugged into her creative vision that had been incubating since circa 2011 called The Vision Train and began a creative experiment. Starting as a 24/7 Global Art Jam on Zoom, she has connected visionary artists from different places around the world via the internet.

=== Style, themes, and methods ===
Sage is considered to be a visionary artist. Her works are created with the intent to inspire spiritual and personal transformation.

She gets inspiration from live music, nature, and conversations. She begins a painting by developing a narrative, then allows the work to emerge, often listening to music or audiobooks to avoid overthinking.

She describes visionary art as a cultural phenomenon. She says her goal is to create a culture of empathy for living beings and the earth, saying, "it's a practice, a meditation, and a dedication that takes [her] into a space of contemplation."

The egg is a common motif in her works. This is representative of Sage's intention "to create portals that open to the infinite possibilities of being and expressing so that we may remember and rediscover who we are, where we originate from, and where we are headed." Another symbolic reference is "the train," intended to convey regenerative journeys of spiritual transformation.
