= Oleg A. Korolev =

Russian painter (born 1968)

Oleg A. Korolev (born March 2, 1968) is a Russian artist, known for his art influenced by Russian religion. His paintings have been exhibited in private and corporate art collections of Russia, Europe, North America, and Australia.

Much of his art work depicts biblical stories inspired by the Eastern Orthodox of Russia. He lives with his family in Moscow.

== Education ==
Since 1979 studied in the Studio of the Classical Drawing (Vilnius, Lithuanian SSR). In 1981 in the Art Studio and in the Art School (Yevpatoria, Ukrainian SSR). From 1984 to 1990 he studied and graduated from the Crimean Art College in Simferopol (Ukrainian SSR).

== Exhibitions ==
1992, 1993 - participated in the group art exhibitions ("The Arnhem gallery", London, Great Britain), 1994- exhibition of the Crimean artists " Art-Effect" ( Simferopol). From 1995 to 1998 - exhibitions in the gallery "KEP" and in the "Private Bank"" ( Simferopol). 1998 - the international art festival "Russian Winter in Montreal", Vand-ArtGallery" (Montreal, Canada). From 1998 to 2001, took part in various private artistic projects with Russian and German art collectors, Since 2000 - a member of the artistic society "Society for Art of Imagination" (the London, Great Britain). 2004 - participated in the art project of the Maestro Ernst Fuchs, as well as studied the painting technique of this famed master, directly from the firsthand (Apocalypse chapel, St.Egyd Cathedral, Klagenfurt, Austria). in 2002,- "All Media Invitational 2002 Period Gallery, (Omaha, USA), ' 2003 Ramsey Center for the Art' (St.Paul, USA), 2006 - "Society for Art of Imagination" The H.R. Giger Museum (Gruyeres, Switzerland), Mall Gallery (London ), 2008 - "Society for Art of Imagination" "Fantasmus" (Saeby, Denmark).

== See also ==
- Visionary art
- Fantastic art
- Society for the Art of Imagination
