= The Wreck of the Deutschland =

1876 ode by G. M. Hopkins, published 1918

The Wreck of the Deutschland is a 35-stanza ode by Gerard Manley Hopkins with Christian themes, composed in 1875 and 1876, though not published until 1918. The poem depicts the shipwreck of the SS Deutschland. Among those killed in the shipwreck were five Franciscan nuns forced to leave Germany by the Falk Laws; the poem is dedicated to their memory.

The poem has attracted considerable critical attention, and is often considered Hopkins' masterpiece because of its length, ambition, and use of sprung rhythm and instress.

== Popular culture ==
- Hopkins's struggles while writing the poem form the basis for the Ron Hansen novel Exiles.
- The poem plays a major role in Anthony Burgess' third "Enderby" novel, The Clockwork Testament, or Enderby's End, in which Enderby pitches an idea for a movie adaptation of the poem and produces a script, but the resulting movie bears little resemblance to either his script or to Hopkins's poem.
- Both Hopkins's efforts to write the poem and the real-life events on the Deutschland are the subject of Simon Edge's novel The Hopkins Conundrum.
- The first several lines of the ode are part of a relief sculpture above the door inside the Palace of Nations, the home of the United Nations Office at Geneva.
