= The Oracle Institute =

American educational charity

The Oracle Institute is a 501(c)(3) educational charity founded in 2004 by Laura M. George and located in Independence, Virginia. Oracle operates a multi-faith spirituality school, an award-winning publishing house, the Peace Pentagon HUB and conference center, and programs that support pluralistic and progressive values. Oracle's stated purpose is to serve as "An Advocate for Peace and a Vanguard for Conscious Evolution," and its formal mission statement is an adaptation of Thomas Jefferson's Act for Religious Freedom.

== Spirituality School ==
Oracle's spirituality school offers courses, conferences, and retreats which focus on the five primary religions (Hinduism, Judaism, Buddhism, Christianity, and Islam), indigenous wisdom traditions, New Age philosophies, peace-building, social justice, and sustainability. In 2015, Oracle sponsored the "Building the New World Conference" at Radford University, which featured futurists Barbara Marx Hubbard, Jerome C. Glenn, and Charles Eisenstein. In 2020, Oracle hosted a virtual "Building the New World Summit," featuring David Korten, Riane Eisler, David Sloan Wilson, Kurt Johnson, David Suzuki, Alex Grey, and Paul K. Chappell.

== Publishing Houses ==
Oracle publishes books under its imprints, Oracle Institute Press and Peace Pentagon Press. Genres include religion and spirituality, personal growth and social evolution, mysticism, the arts, and children's fiction. Oracle Institute Press has won five book awards, including two Independent Publisher Book Awards in the Religion category, the Young Voices Seal of Approval for children's fiction, and two Indie Book Awards in the Spirituality and Performing Arts categories.

== Peace Pentagon ==
In 2012, after two years of litigation, during which Oracle was represented by The Rutherford Institute, Oracle achieved the right to build the "Peace Pentagon" along the New River in Grayson County, Virginia. The Peace Pentagon is an energy-efficient PassivHaus structure with a multi-faith sanctuary and conference facilities.

== Valley of Light ==
In 2015, Oracle founded an intentional community called the "Valley of Light" for cultural creatives who live and work at the Oracle Campus. The Valley of Light micro-community was inspired by the Federation of Damanhur, whose Ambassadors regularly visit Oracle Campus. The Valley of Light is a member of the Fellowship for Intentional Community.

== WCPA & ECI Headquarters ==
In 2020, the Peace Pentagon at Oracle Campus became the United States headquarters for the Earth Constitution Institute (ECI) and the World Constitution and Parliament Association (WCPA), international organizations dedicated to World Federalism and the adoption of the Earth Constitution.

== Laura M. George ==
In 2022, Oracle’s founder Laura M. George was named an Evolutionary Leader.

== Publications ==
Authors published by the Oracle Institute Press include Oberto "Falco" Airaudi, Yuval Ron, Patricia Albere, Valerie Tarico, PhD, Glen T. Martin, PhD, and Oracle's founder, Rev. Laura M. George, JD.

- The Truth: About the Five Primary Religions. Laura M. George (1st Ed. © 2006; 2nd Ed. © 2010). Winner of a 2006 IPPY Award. Oracle Institute Press: ISBN 978-0-9773929-1-9
- The Love: Of the Fifth Spiritual Paradigm. Laura M. George with contributions from Desmond Tutu, Bill McKibben, Aung San Suu Kyi, Maya Angelou, David Suzuki, Wendell Berry, Stephen Dunn, Alex Grey, Brian McLaren, Chris Mercogliano, Andrew Cohen and others (© 2010). Oracle Institute Press: ISBN 978-0-9773929-2-6
- Trusting Doubt: A Former Evangelical Looks at Old Beliefs in a New Light. Valerie Tarico (1st Ed. © 2010; 2nd Ed. © 2017). Winner of a 2011 IPPY Award. Oracle Institute Press: ISBN 978-1-937465-22-3
- Deas and Other Imaginings: Ten Spiritual Folktales for Children. Valerie Tarico (1st Ed. © 2011). Winner of Young Voices Seal of Approval. The Oracle Institute Press: ISBN 978-0-9773929-8-8
- Bral Talej: Damanhur Divination Cards. Shama Viola and Oberto Airaudi (© 2011). The Oracle Institute Press: UPC 8032937910017
- Dying to Learn: First Book of the Initiate. Oberto Airaudi with a Foreword by Laura M. George (Rev. English Ed. © 2012). The Oracle Institute Press: ISBN 978-1-937465-01-8
- Reborn to Live: Second Book of the Initiate. Oberto Airaudi with a Foreword by Alex Grey (Revised English Ed. © 2013). The Oracle Institute Press: ISBN 978-1-937465-05-6
- Seven Scarlet Doors: Third Book of the Initiate. Oberto Airaudi with a Foreword by Barbara Marx Hubbard (Rev. English Ed. © 2013). The Oracle Institute Press: ISBN 978-1-937465-09-4
- Divine Attunement: Music as a Path to Wisdom. Yuval Ron with a Foreword by Zia Inayat-Khan (© 2014). Winner of two Indie Book Awards. Oracle Institute Press: ISBN 978-1-937465-162
- Evolutionary Relationships: Unleashing the Power of Mutual Awakening. Patricia Albere with a Foreword by Katherine Woodward Thomas (© 2017). Oracle Institute Press: ISBN 978-1-937465-23-0
- The Earth Constitution Solution: Design for a Living Planet. Glen T. Martin with a Foreword by Ellen Brown (© 2020). Peace Pentagon Press, an imprint of Oracle Institute Press: ISBN 978-1-937465-28-5
- The Light: And the New Human. Laura M. George (© 2022). Oracle Institute Press: ISBN 978-1-937465-32-2

== See also ==
- World Constitution and Parliament Association
