= Gerard Manley Hopkins =

English poet and Catholic priest (1844–1889)

The Reverend Gerard Manley Hopkins SJ
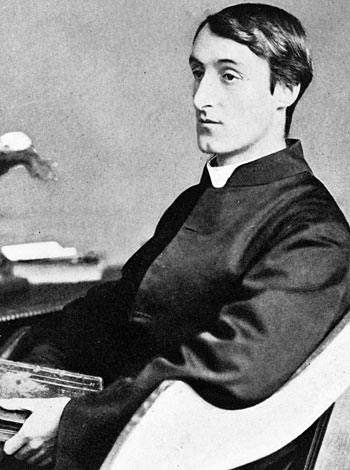

Orders
- Ordination: September 1877

Personal details
- Born: 28 July 1844 Stratford, Essex, England
- Died: 8 June 1889 (aged 44) Dublin, Ireland
- Buried: Glasnevin Cemetery, Dublin, Ireland
- Denomination: Catholic Church
- Occupation: Poet; Jesuit priest; academic
- Education: Highgate School; Heythrop College, London; Balliol College, Oxford

Gerard Manley Hopkins (28 July 1844 – 8 June 1889) was an English poet and Jesuit priest.

The eldest of nine children, he was the son of a deeply religious High Anglican couple. His father, Manley Hopkins, was a prolific writer as well as having founded a marine insurance company, and his mother was the daughter of a physician.

Hopkins initially intended to become a painter, but soon gravitated towards poetry, as well as showing an early interest in asceticism. He studied Classics at Balliol College, Oxford, where he became friends with Robert Bridges, and was influenced by the work of Christina Rossetti. There, Hopkins was introduced to Digby Mackworth Dolben, for whom he seems to have had intense, if unrequited feelings. After this he converted to Roman Catholicism, which caused an estrangement between Hopkins and some members of his family, and eventually became a Jesuit priest.

Hopkins was troubled by anxiety and melancholy throughout his life, as well as by a perceived conflict between the austerity of his religious faith and his portrayal of the natural world. Although he attempted several times to give up writing poetry, he nevertheless continued to do so. He also sketched and kept prose journals throughout his career. He spent the last five years of his life in Dublin, where he worked as a professor of Latin and Greek. He died of typhoid fever in 1889.

Although Hopkins's poetry was not widely known during his lifetime, his prosody – notably his concept of sprung rhythm – made him an innovator, as did his praise of God through vivid use of natural imagery. After Hopkins's death, Robert Bridges published a few of his mature poems in anthologies. By 1930 Hopkins's work was seen as one of the most original literary advances of his century.

== Early life ==
=== Family ===
Gerard Manley Hopkins was born in Stratford, Essex (now in Greater London) to Manley and Catherine Hopkins, née Smith. He was the eldest of nine children. Both parents were deeply religious high-church Anglicans, and Hopkins was christened at the Anglican church of St John's, Stratford.

The young Hopkins was not close to his siblings, and had a troubled relationship with his father, Manley Hopkins, a man of many talents who had founded a marine insurance firm and at one time served as Hawaiian consul-general in London. He was also for a time churchwarden at St John-at-Hampstead. He was a prolific writer who published several works of poetry, including A Philosopher's Stone and Other Poems (1843), Pietas Metrica (1849), and Spicelegium Poeticum, A Gathering of Verses by Manley Hopkins (1892). He also wrote a history of Hawaii, A Manual of Marine Insurance, A Handbook of Averages and an unpublished novel, and in addition to this wrote and reviewed poetry for The Times.

Hopkins's mother, Catherine was the daughter of a London physician, and was particularly fond of music and of reading, especially German philosophy, literature and the novels of Dickens. Catherine's sister, Maria Smith Giberne, taught Hopkins to sketch. The interest was supported by his uncle, Edward Smith, his great-uncle Richard James Lane, a professional artist, and other family members. Hopkins's initial ambition was to be a painter – he pursued his interest in sketching throughout his life and was inspired as an adult by the work of John Ruskin and the Pre-Raphaelites.

Hopkins's grandfather was the physician John Simm Smith, a university colleague of John Keats, and a close friend of the philanthropist Ann Thwaytes. One of his uncles was Charles Gordon Hopkins, a politician of the Hawaiian Kingdom, and he was a first cousin of the writer, historian and suffragette Isabel Giberne Sieveking.

Hopkins found his early training in visual art supported his later work as a poet. His siblings also drew inspiration from literature, religion, and the arts. In 1878, his sister Milicent (1849–1946) enrolled in an Anglican sisterhood. Kate (1856–1933) would help Hopkins publish the first edition of his poetry. His youngest sister Grace (1857–1945) set many of his poems to music. Lionel (1854–1952) became a world-famous expert on archaic and colloquial Chinese. Arthur (1848–1930) and Everard (1860–1928) were highly successful artists. Cyril (1846–1932) would join his father's insurance firm.

=== Highgate School ===
In 1852, the family moved to Hampstead, near where John Keats had lived 30 years before and close to the green spaces of Hampstead Heath. When Hopkins was ten years old, he was sent to board at Highgate School (1854–1863), where he excelled in his studies, but was frequently in trouble with the headmaster, the Revd Dyne. Among his teachers at Highgate was Richard Watson Dixon, who became an enduring friend and correspondent. Of the older pupils Hopkins recalls in his boarding house, the poet Philip Stanhope Worsley won the Newdigate Prize.

While studying Keats's poetry, Hopkins wrote The Escorial (1860) and The Mermaids, his earliest extant poems. Here too he practised early attempts at asceticism. He once argued that most people drank more liquids than they really needed and bet that he could go without drinking for a week. He persisted until his tongue was black and he collapsed at drill. On another occasion, he abstained from salt for a week.

== Oxford ==
Between1863–1867 Hopkins studied Classics at Balliol College, Oxford. He was very happy at Balliol, and made many friends. Among them was Robert Bridges (later Poet Laureate of the United Kingdom), with whom Hopkins formed a lifelong friendship, which proved important to his development as a poet and in establishing his posthumous acclaim. Hopkins was deeply impressed with the work of Christina Rossetti, who became one of his great contemporary influences. The two met in 1864. During this time he also studied with the writer and critic Walter Pater, who tutored him in 1866, remaining friends until Hopkins left Oxford for the second time in October 1879.

=== Digby Mackworth Dolben ===
Digby Mackworth Dolben

In 1865, when he was at Bailliol, Hopkins met Digby Mackworth Dolben, who was Robert Bridges's distant cousin, and a fellow Etonian. Dolben was seventeen at the time, a poet and "a Christian Uranian", who was hoping to attend the University the following year. This meeting proved significant both in terms of Hopkins's poetry and in his emotional life.

Robert Bernard Martin wrote in his biography Gerard Manley Hopkins: A Very Private Life, that when Hopkins first met Dolben, on Dolben's 17th birthday in Oxford in February 1865, it "was, quite simply, the most momentous emotional event of [his] undergraduate years, probably of his entire life." Martin wrote:

Hopkins was completely taken with Dolben, who was nearly four years his junior, and his private journal for confessions the following year proves how absorbed he was in imperfectly suppressed erotic thoughts of him.

Dolben never returned to Oxford, and though Hopkins wrote many times to him, Dolben did not reply, much to Hopkins's distress. Hopkins also composed two poems about Dolben, The Beginning of the End, and Where art thou friend?

Where art thou friend, whom I shall never see,

Conceiving whom I must conceive amiss?

Or sundered from my sight in an age that is

Or far off promise of a time to be ...

Robert Bridges, who edited the first edition of Dolben's poems as well as Hopkins's, cautioned that the first poem "must never be printed", though Bridges himself included it in the first edition (1918). Hopkins never saw Dolben again. His high Anglican confessor seems to have forbidden him to have any contact with Dolben except by letter, and two years later, in June 1867, Dolben died by drowning. Michael Matthew Kaylor writes in his book,Secreted desires: the major Uranians – Hopkins, Pater and Wilde:

Ironically, fate may have bestowed more through Dolben's death than it could ever have bestowed through longer life ... [for] many of Hopkins's best poems – impregnated with an elegiac longing for Dolben, his lost beloved and his muse – were the result.

== Priesthood ==
=== Asceticism ===
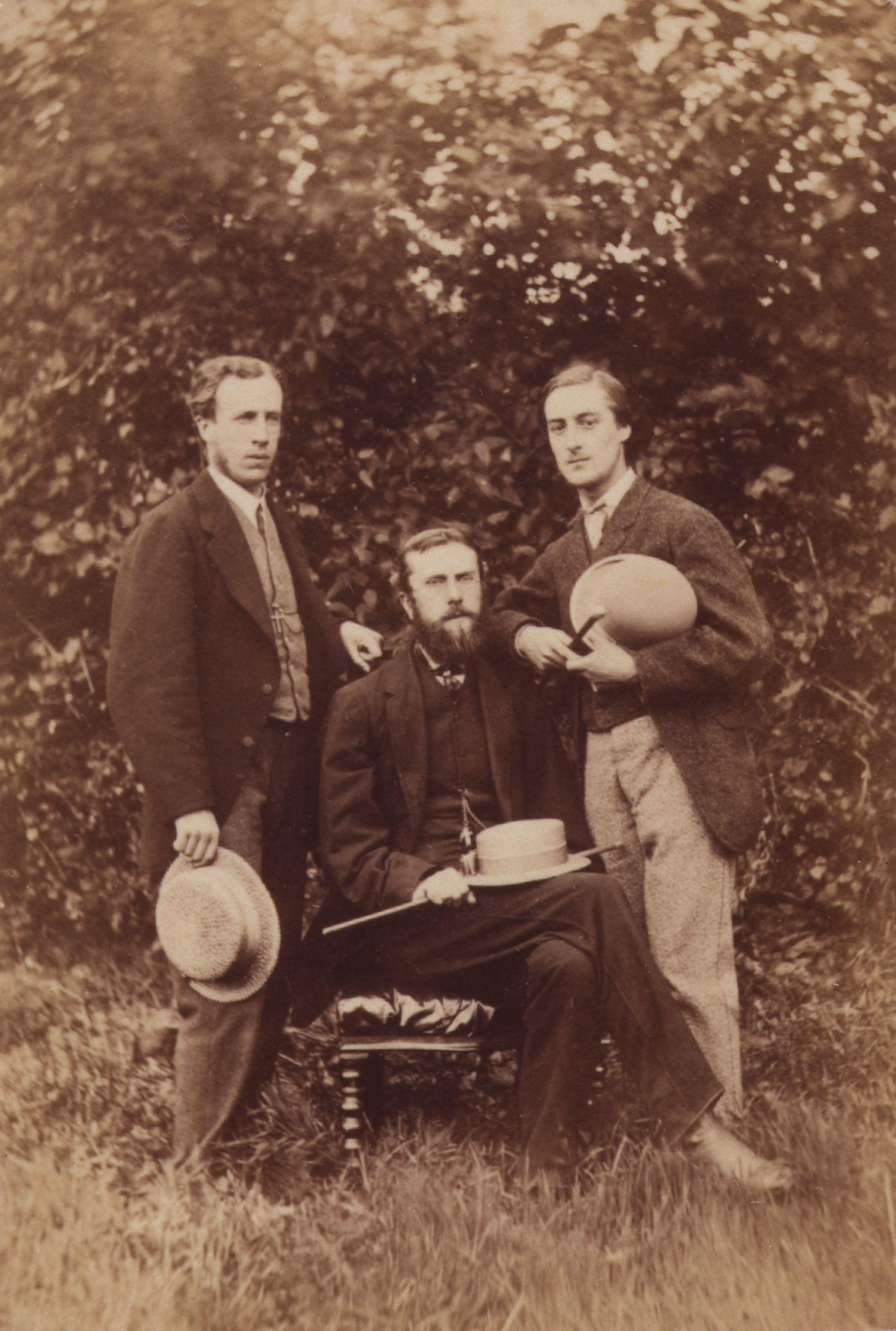
Alfred William Garrett, William Alexander Comyn Macfarlane and Hopkins (left to right), by Thomas C. Bayfield, 1866

In a journal entry of 6 November 1865, Hopkins declared his ascetic intentions for his life and work, writing: "On this day by God's grace I resolved to give up all beauty until I had His leave for it." His letters reflect his commitment to this vow. On one occasion he writes of denying himself a view of rye fields at sunset as "penance" for having "talked too freely" at dinner. On another, he writes to his mother of his weight loss during Lent, describing himself as: "thinner than I ever saw myself in the face, with my cheeks like two harp-frames."

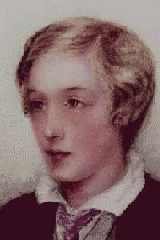
Hopkins, painted 24 July 1866

On 18 January 1866, Hopkins composed his poem, The Habit of Perfection. On 23 January, he included poetry in a list of things to be given up for Lent. In July, he decided to become a Roman Catholic and travelled to Birmingham in September to consult the leader of the Oxford converts, John Henry Newman. Newman received him into the Roman Catholic Church on 21 October 1866.

=== Conversion ===
This decision to convert estranged Hopkins from his family and from a number of acquaintances. After graduating in 1867, he was provided by Newman with a teaching post at the Oratory in Birmingham, during which time he began to study the violin. On 5 May 1868 Hopkins firmly "resolved to be a religious." Less than a week later, he made a bonfire of his poetry and gave it up almost entirely for seven years.He continued to write a detailed prose journal in 1868–1875. He also felt a call to enter the ministry and decided to become a Jesuit. He paused first to visit Switzerland, which officially forbade Jesuits to enter.

In September 1868, Hopkins began his Jesuit novitiate at Manresa House, Roehampton, under the guidance of Alfred Weld. Two years later he moved to St Mary's Hall, and from there to Stonyhurst, for philosophical studies, taking vows of poverty, chastity and obedience on 8 September 1870. He had decided to give up poetry, as he felt that his love of poetry had stopped him devoting himself wholly to religion. However, on reading Duns Scotus in 1872, he saw how the two need not conflict. Unable to suppress a desire to describe the natural world, he also wrote music, sketched, and for church occasions, wrote "verses". He later wrote sermons and other religious pieces.

=== Return to Poetry ===
In 1874, Hopkins returned to Manresa House to teach Classics. While studying in the Jesuit house of theological studies, St Beuno's College, near St Asaph in Wales, he was asked by his religious superior to write a poem to commemorate the wreck of a German ship in a storm, so in 1875 he took up poetry once more to write a lengthy piece, "The Wreck of the Deutschland", inspired by the Deutschland incident, a maritime disaster in which 157 people died, including five Franciscan nuns who had been leaving Germany due to harsh anti-Catholic laws (see Kulturkampf). The work displays both the religious concerns and some of the unusual metre and rhythms of Hopkins's subsequent poetry not present in his few remaining early works. It not only depicts the dramatic events and heroic deeds of the disaster, but tells of him reconciling the terrible events with God's higher purpose. The poem was accepted by a Jesuit publication, but was not ultimately printed. This rejection fed Hopkins's ambivalence about his poetry, most of which remained unpublished until after his death.

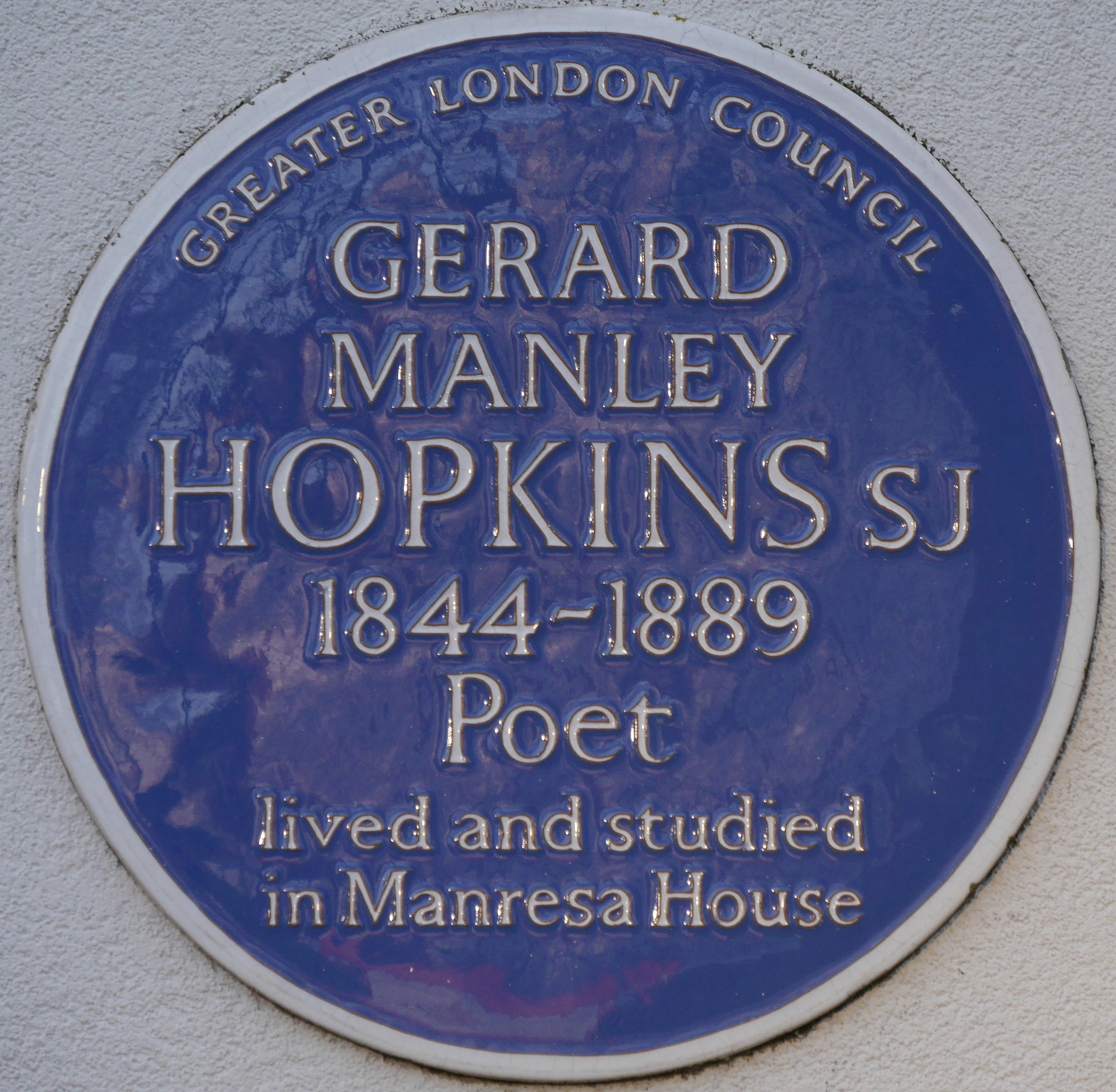
Blue plaque commemorating Hopkins in Roehampton, London

The life of a Jesuit was austere and restrictive. Hopkins's biographer Robert Bernard Martin notes that: "the life expectancy of a man becoming a novice at twenty-one was twenty-three more years rather than the forty years of males of the same age in the general population." Hopkins, who had left Oxford with first-class honours, failed his final theology exam. This meant that despite his ordination in 1877, he was unlikely to progress in the order.

=== Ordination and teaching ===
In 1877 Hopkins wrote God's Grandeur, an array of sonnets that included "The Starlight Night". He finished "The Windhover" only a few months before his ordination. His life as a Jesuit trainee, though rigorous, isolated and sometimes unpleasant, at least had offered some stability; the uncertain and varied work after ordination was even harder on his sensibilities. In October 1877, not long after completing "The Sea and the Skylark" and only a month after his ordination, Hopkins took up duties as sub-minister and teacher of Latin and Greek at Mount St Mary's College near Sheffield. In July 1878 he became curate at the Jesuit church in Mount Street, London, and in December that of St Aloysius's Church, Oxford. While ministering in Oxford, he became a founding member of The Newman Society, established in 1878 for Catholic members of the University of Oxford, after which he moved on to Manchester, Liverpool and Glasgow.

== Dublin ==
In 1884, Hopkins became a professor of Greek and Latin at University College Dublin. His English roots and disagreement with the Irish politics of the time, along with his small stature (5 ft 2 in or 1.57 m), unprepossessing nature and personal oddities, reduced his effectiveness as a teacher. He developed serious eye strain, and he was deeply unhappy in his job. This and his isolation in Ireland deepened a gloom that was reflected in his poems of the time, such as "I Wake and Feel the Fell of Dark, not Day". They came to be known as the "terrible sonnets", not for their quality but according to Hopkins's friend Canon Richard Watson Dixon, because they reached the "terrible crystal", meaning they crystallised the melancholic dejection that plagued the latter part of Hopkins's life.

In the late 1880s Hopkins met Matthew Russell of the Irish Monthly, who introduced him to Katharine Tynan and W. B. Yeats.

== Final years ==
Several factors restricted Hopkins's poetic inspiration in his last five years. His workload was heavy. He disliked living in Dublin, away from England and friends. He was disappointed at how far Dublin had fallen from its Georgian elegance of the previous century, and the sense of melancholy that had affected him throughout his life had deepened.

In a letter to a friend, he writes:

The melancholy I have been all my life subject to has become of late years not indeed more intense in its fits but rather more distributed, constant and crippling. One, the lightest but a very inconvenient form of it, is daily anxiety about work to be done, which makes me break off or never finish all that lies outside that work... when I am at the worst, though my judgement is never affected, my state is much like madness.

After several years' ill health, Hopkins died of typhoid fever in 1889 at the age of 44. His final poem, "To R. B.", was written a few months before his death, and was sent to Robert Bridges. He is thought to have suffered throughout his life from what today might be labelled bipolar disorder or chronic unipolar depression and battled a deep sense of melancholic anguish. His final words on his deathbed were, "I am so happy, I am so happy. I loved my life."

Hopkins was buried in Glasnevin Cemetery. His funeral was held in St Francis Xavier Church in Gardiner Street, located in Georgian Dublin.

== Poetry ==
=== "The terrible sonnets" ===
The author John Bayley wrote in a review of Robert Bernard Martin's biography of Hopkins: "All his life Hopkins was haunted by the sense of personal bankruptcy and impotence, the straining of 'time's eunuch' with no more to 'spend' ...", a sense of inadequacy graphically expressed in his last sonnets. Toward the end of his life, Hopkins suffered several long bouts of depression. His "terrible sonnets" struggle with problems of religious doubt. He described them to Bridges as "[t]he thin gleanings of a long weary while".

"Thou Art Indeed Just, Lord" (1889) echoes Jeremiah 12:1 in asking why the wicked prosper. It reflects the exasperation of a faithful servant who feels he has been neglected, and is addressed to a divine person ("Sir") capable of hearing the complaint, but seemingly unwilling to listen.

=== Sprung rhythm ===
"Pied Beauty"

Glory be to God for dappled things—
For skies of couple-colour as a brinded cow;
For rose-moles all in stipple upon trout that swim;
Fresh-firecoal chestnut-falls; finches' wings;
Landscape plotted and pieced—fold, fallow, and plough;
And áll trádes, their gear and tackle and trim.

All things counter, original, spare, strange;
Whatever is fickle, freckled (who knows how?)
With swift, slow; sweet, sour; adazzle, dim;
He fathers-forth whose beauty is past change:
Praise him.

— "Pied Beauty" written 1877.

Much of Hopkins's historical importance has to do with the changes he brought to the form of poetry, which ran contrary to conventional ideas of metre. Prior to Hopkins, most Middle English and Modern English poetry was based on a rhythmic structure inherited from the Norman side of English literary heritage. This structure is based on repeating "feet" of two or three syllables, with the stressed syllable falling in the same place on each repetition. Hopkins called this structure "running rhythm", and although he wrote some of his early verse in running rhythm, he became fascinated with the older rhythmic structure of the Anglo-Saxon tradition, of which Beowulf is the most famous example.

Hopkins called his own rhythmic structure sprung rhythm, with 'sprung' meaning 'abrupt', since, according to The London Magazine, "two stressed syllables can occur abruptly one after the other without any unstressed syllables between them." Hopkins saw sprung rhythm as a way to escape the constraints of running rhythm, which he said inevitably pushed poetry written in it to become "same and tame". In this way, Hopkins's sprung rhythm can be seen as anticipating much of free verse. His work has no great affinity with either of the contemporary Pre-Raphaelite and neo-romanticism schools, although he does share their descriptive love of nature and he is often seen as a precursor to modernist poetry, or as a bridge between the two poetic eras.

=== Use of language ===
Hopkins was a supporter of linguistic purism in English. In an 1882 letter to Robert Bridges, Hopkins writes: "It makes one weep to think what English might have been; for in spite of all that Shakespeare and Milton have done... no beauty in a language can make up for want of purity." He took time to learn Old English, which became a major influence on his writing. In the same letter to Bridges he calls Old English "a vastly superior thing to what we have now."

He uses many archaic and dialect words but also coins new words. One example of this is twindles, which seems from its context in Inversnaid to mean a combination of twines and dwindles. He often creates compound adjectives, sometimes with a hyphen (such as dapple-dawn-drawn falcon) but often without, as in rolling level underneath him steady air. This use of compound adjectives, similar to the Old English use of compound nouns via kennings, concentrates his images, communicating to his readers the instress of the poet's perceptions of an inscape.

Hopkins was influenced by the Welsh language, which he had acquired while studying theology at St Beuno's near St Asaph. The poetic forms of Welsh literature and particularly cynghanedd, with its emphasis on repeating sounds, accorded with his own style and became a prominent feature of his work. This reliance on similar-sounding words with close or differing senses means that his poems are best understood if read aloud. An important element in his work is Hopkins' own concept of inscape, which was derived in part from the medieval theologian Duns Scotus. Anthony Domestico writes:

Inscape, for Hopkins, is the charged essence, the absolute singularity that gives each created thing its being; instress is both the energy that holds the inscape together and the process by which this inscape is perceived by an observer. We instress the inscape of a tulip, Hopkins would say, when we appreciate the particular delicacy of its petals, when we are enraptured by its specific, inimitable shade of pink.

"The Windhover" aims to depict not the bird in general, but instead one instance and its relation to the breeze, as well as using it as a symbol of Christ. In a letter to his friend Robert Bridges, Hopkins wrote that he considered it to be his finest poem.

I caught this morning morning's minion, king-
dom of daylight's dauphin, dapple-dawn-drawn Falcon, in his riding
Of the rolling level underneath him steady air, and striding
High there, how he rung upon the rein of a wimpling wing
In his ecstasy! then off, off forth on swing,
As a skate's heel sweeps smooth on a bow-bend: the hurl and gliding
Rebuffed the big wind. My heart in hiding
Stirred for a bird, – the achieve of, the mastery of the thing!

— The first stanza of "The Windhover"
written 30 May 1877, published 1918.

During his lifetime, Hopkins published only a very few poems. It was only through the efforts of Robert Bridges that his works were later seen. Despite Hopkins burning all his poems on entering the Jesuit novitiate, he had already sent some to Bridges, who was one of the only people to see them for some years. After Hopkins's death the poems were distributed to a wider audience, mostly of fellow poets, and in 1918 Bridges, by then poet laureate, published a collected edition. An expanded edition, prepared by Charles Williams, appeared in 1930, and a greatly expanded edition by William Henry Gardner appeared in 1948 (eventually reaching a fourth edition, 1967, with N. H. Mackenzie).

Notable collections of Hopkins's manuscripts and publications are in Campion Hall, Oxford; the Bodleian Library, Oxford; and the Foley Library at Gonzaga University in Spokane, Washington.

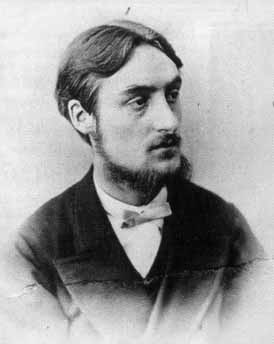
Gerard Manley Hopkins

=== Homoeroticism ===
Although as a Jesuit, Hopkins led a life of strict celibacy, his writings show a strong suggestion that he was attracted to men. Simon Edge writes in The Guardian: "Although his work is overwhelmingly religious, a frequent theme is the physical beauty of working men, as well as of Christ, and the frenzied repetitions and climaxes of his verse seem to speak strongly of pent-up passion."

Gregory Woods writes in A History of Gay Literature: “His (Hopkins's) technical innovations are the key to the actual expression of an eroticism which, for all his struggles against the temptations of voyeurism and masturbation, he could not conceive of suppressing altogether.”

In 2006, Michael Matthew Kaylor argued for Hopkins's inclusion with the Uranian poets, a group whose writings derived, in many ways, from prose works of Walter Pater, Hopkins's academic coach for his Greats exams and later a lifelong friend.

In 2000, Justus George Lawler criticised Robert Martin's biography by suggesting that Martin "cannot see the heterosexual beam... for the homosexual biographical mote in his own eye... it amounts to a slanted eisegesis". In 2000, Julia Saville viewed the religious imagery in the poems as Hopkins's way of expressing the tension with homosexual identity and desire.

=== Conflict between asceticism and creativity ===
Hopkins's letters show repeated signs of his asceticism and self-denial. The biographer and poet Paul Mariani found in Hopkins poems "an irreconcilable tension – on the one hand, the selflessness demanded by Jesuit discipline; on the other, the seeming self-indulgence of poetic creation."

Christopher Ricks noted that Hopkins engaged in penitential practices, but wrote that: "all of these self-inflictions were not self-inflictions to him, and they are his business – or are his understanding of what it was for him to be about his Father's business." Ricks highlights the importance of the role of Hopkins's religious commitment to his writing, and cautions against assigning a priority of influence to any sexual instincts over other factors such as Hopkins's estrangement from his family.

=== Isolation ===
Hopkins spent the last five years of his life as a classics professor at University College Dublin. Hopkins's isolation in 1885 was multiple: a Jesuit distanced from his Anglican family and his homeland, an Englishman teaching in Dublin during a time of political strife, and an unpublished poet striving to reconcile his artistic and religious callings. The poem "To seem the stranger" was written in Ireland between 1885 and 1886 and is a poem of isolation and loneliness.

== Legacy ==
Ricks called Hopkins "the most original poet of the Victorian age." Hopkins is considered as influential as T. S. Eliot in initiating the modernist movement in poetry. His experiments with elliptical phrasing, double meanings and quirky conversational rhythms turned out to be liberating to poets such as W. H. Auden and Dylan Thomas. Hopkins also had a direct influence on the Ghanaian poet and novelist Kojo Laing, whose poem "No needle in the sky" has been called an intercultural translation of Hopkins's "The Windhover". The American author Ron Hansen held the Gerard Manley Hopkins, SJ, Professorship in English at Santa Clara University; his novel Exiles dramatises Hopkins' composition of The Wreck of the Deutschland.

In 2009 a play based on Hopkins's work, No Worst There is None, by the Irish company The Stomach Box, was performed at Newman House on St Stephen’s Green, where Hopkins spent his final years as a Jesuit.

British composer Mary Plumstead used Hopkins' text in her song "Pied Beauty."

The Gerard Manley Hopkins Building in University College Dublin is named after him.

Hopkins's relationship with Dolben was explored in the 2017 novel The Hopkins Conundrum.

Mortal includes lines from "God's Grandeur" in the song "Bright Wings" on their 1993 album Fathom.

Philosopher of Science Nancy Cartwright named her 1999 book The Dappled World: A Study of the Boundaries of Science after the opening lines of "Pied Beauty".

American singer/songwriter Natalie Merchant set Hopkins's poem "Spring and Fall: To a Young Child" to music on her 2010 album Leave Your Sleep.

Paul Kelly sings "God's Grandeur" on his 2018 album Nature.

== Selected poems ==
Well-known works by Hopkins include:

- "Binsey Poplars"
- "Spring and Fall"
- "Pied Beauty"
- "The Windhover: To Christ our Lord"
- The Wreck of the Deutschland

=== Recordings ===
- Richard Austin reads Hopkins's poetry in Back to Beauty's Giver.
- Jeremy Northam reads Hopkins's poetry in The Great Poets.

== See also ==
- Adoro te devote (translated by G. M. Hopkins)
- Caudate sonnet
- Curtal sonnet (invented by G. M. Hopkins)
- Sprung rhythm
- Inscape and instress
- Inscape (visual art)
