= Visionary art =

Art that purports to transcend the physical world

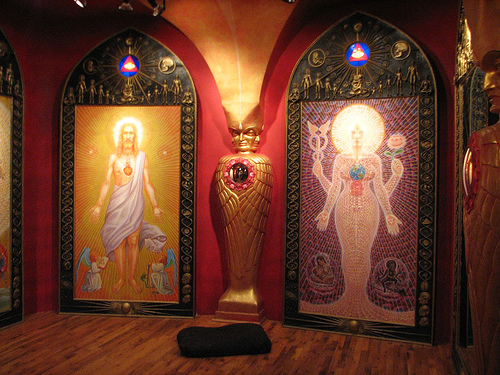
Paintings by Alex Grey in The Chapel of Sacred Mirrors

Visionary art is art that purports to transcend the physical world and portray a wider vision of awareness including spiritual or mystical themes, or is based in such experiences.

== History ==
The Vienna School of Fantastic Realism, first established in 1946, is considered to be an important technical and philosophical catalyst in its strong influence upon contemporary visionary art. Its artists included Ernst Fuchs, Rudolf Hausner, Arik Brauer, Wolfgang Hutter and Anton Lehmden among others. Several artists who would later work in visionary art trained under Fuchs, including Mati Klarwein, Robert Venosa, and De Es Schwertberger.

== Definition ==
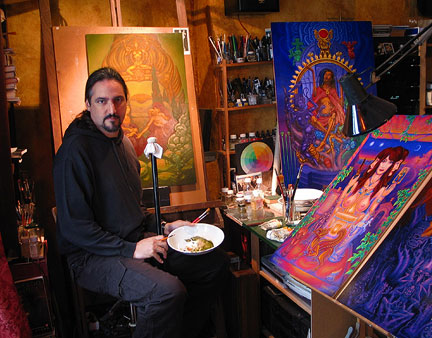
Visionary artist Laurence Caruana with visionary art paintings.

Visionary art often carries themes of spiritual, mystical or inner awareness. Despite this broad definition, there does seem to be emerging some definition to what constitutes the contemporary visionary art 'scene' and which artists can be considered especially influential. Symbolism, Cubism, Surrealism and Psychedelic art are also direct precursors to contemporary visionary art. Notable visionary artists count Hilma af Klint, Hieronymous Bosch, William Blake, Morris Graves (of the Pacific Northwest School of Visionary Art), Emil Bisttram, and Gustave Moreau amongst their antecedents.

== Schools and organizations ==
The Vienna School of Fantastic Realism, which includes Ernst Fuchs and Arik Brauer, is also a strong influence on visionary culture. It may also be considered the European version, with the names being interchangeable.

The Society for the Art of Imagination, founded by Brigid Marlin serves as an important portal for visionary art events. More recently, a new wave of visionary artists collaborate to function as modern cooperatives involved in self-publishing and promotion of visionary artists through the internet and via festivals such as Burning Man and Boom Festival, and exhibition/ritual spaces such as Temple of Visions and the Interdimensional Art Movement.

The American Visionary Art Museum in Baltimore, Maryland, is a museum devoted entirely to visionary art.

== Gallery ==
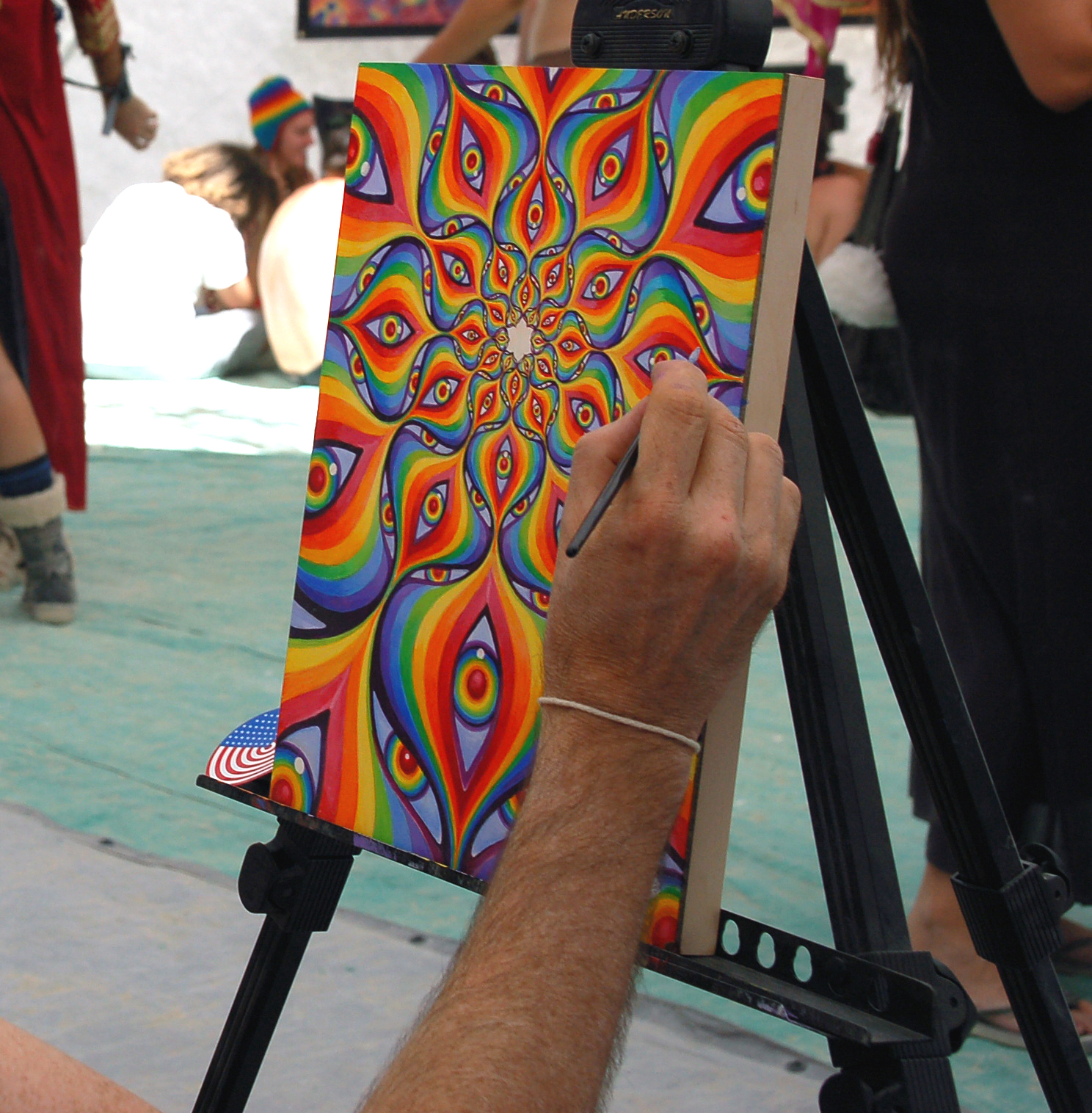
A painting by Alex Grey

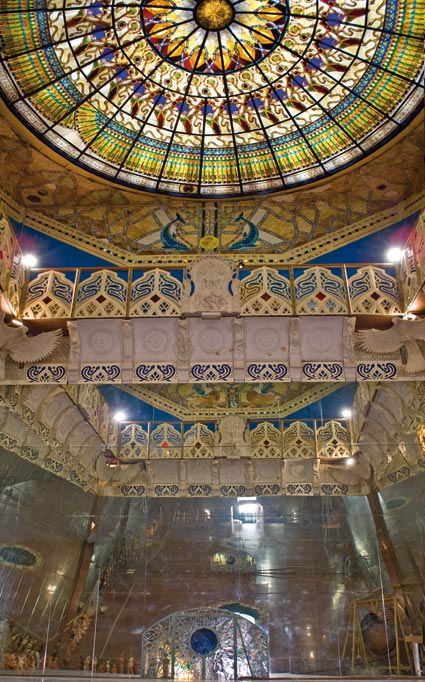
Hall of Mirrors,
Temples of Humankind, Federation of Damanhur

== See also ==
- Burning Man – Annual experimental event in Nevada, US
- Conceptual art – Art movement
- Fantastic art – Type of art that explores fantasy and imagination
- Horror vacui (art) – Latin phrase which means "fear of empty space"
- Outsider art – Art created outside the boundaries of official culture by those untrained in the arts
- Psychedelic art – Visual art inspired by psychedelic experiences
- Surrealism – International cultural movement (1920s–1950s)
- Symbolism (movement) – Late 19th-century art movement in Europe
- Temples of Humankind – Italian underground structures
