= Inscape Design College =

South African higher education institution

Inscape Education Group (previously Inscape Design College), is a higher education institution which offers contact learning located at campuses in Durban, Cape Town, Pretoria and Johannesburg in South Africa. The institution also offers distance learning through an online platform. In 2018, the Inscape expanded its operations to the United Arab Emirates, establishing a campus in Dubai. It registered with the Department of Higher Education and Training as a private higher education institution under the Higher Education Act of 1997.

== See also ==
- Inscape (visual art)
- Inscape
