= The Garden God =

1905 book

The Garden God: A Tale of Two Boys
- Author: Forrest Reid
- Language: English
- Publisher: David Nutt
- Publication date: 1905
- Publication place: United Kingdom

The Garden God: A Tale of Two Boys is a novel by Forrest Reid. It was first published in 1905 by David Nutt.

An analysis of the novel published on English Studies reported that the novel had a direct influence on E. M. Forster's classic novel Maurice. A modern edition of the novel edited by Michael Matthew Kaylor was published by Valancourt Books in 2007.
