= The Rutherford Institute =

American non-profit organization

- Formation: 1982; 44 years ago
- Founder: John W. Whitehead
- Type: public interest law firm
- Purpose: Defense of civil liberties, religious liberties, and human rights
- Headquarters: Charlottesville, Virginia
- Location: United States
- Services: Legal services
- Website: Rutherford.org

The Rutherford Institute is a public interest law firm dedicated to the defense of civil liberties, human rights, and religious liberties. Based in Charlottesville, Virginia, the non-profit organization's motto is "It's our job to make the government play by the rules of the Constitution." The organization was founded in 1982 by John W. Whitehead, who continued to be its president as of 2015. The Rutherford Institute offers free legal services to those who have had their rights threatened or violated. The Rutherford Institute has a network of affiliate attorneys across the United States and funds its efforts through donations. In addition to its offer of legal services, the organization offers free educational materials for those interested in the U.S. Constitution and Bill of Rights.

While once primarily concerned with the defense of religious liberties, the organization later expanded its mission to encompass other constitutional issues such as search and seizure, free speech, and zero tolerance policy. Some of the institute's legal actions were widely reported, including helping Paula Jones pursue a sexual harassment lawsuit in 1997 against President Bill Clinton, and its defense of middle and high school students suspended and expelled under inflexible zero tolerance policies, and the free speech rights of preachers and political protestors. Declaring that we live in a police state where "freedom has become fascism", the institute has denounced no-knock warrants and granting police qualified immunity. It also defended state laws banning homosexual conduct in Bowers v. Hardwick.

The Rutherford Institute has worked with a number of similar groups across the political spectrum, including the ACLU and the Cato Institute. Whitehead was described by jazz historian and civil libertarian Nat Hentoff as "this nation's Paul Revere of protecting civil liberties."

== Foundation ==
The Rutherford Institute was named after Samuel Rutherford, a 17th-century theologian who wrote a book, Lex, Rex, which challenged the concept of the divine right of kings. When The Rutherford Institute was founded, conservative Protestants in the United States were reconsidering their role in American political and legal life, perceiving that the federal government was intent on encroaching on Americans' religious liberties. Organizations such as The Rutherford Institute pursued matters of religious liberties in the courts, and The Rutherford Institute became the model for groups such as the National Legal Foundation, the Liberty Counsel, and the American Center for Law and Justice. Bryan McKenzie of the Charlottesville Daily Progress described the institute as "a more conservative American Civil Liberties Union" (ACLU).

== History and legal actions ==
Since its founding, The Rutherford Institute has expanded its aims from defending the religious liberties of Christians to include defending the religious liberties of all Americans, as well as working to preserve rights such as free speech and the right to be secure from unreasonable search and seizure. However, the institute has sometimes taken pro-government positions, such as defending laws which banned gay sex.

=== Religious liberty ===
In 2004, the group filed a lawsuit against Muskogee Public Schools in Oklahoma on behalf of Nashala Hearn, an 11-year-old Muslim student who was suspended for wearing a religious headscarf to school.

In 2007, they filed a lawsuit against Freehold Township, New Jersey on behalf of an Orthodox rabbi, Avraham Bernstein, alleging that the town was persecuting Bernstein for holding prayer meetings in his home on the Sabbath.

In 2011, the group took up the cause of Laura George, founder of the Oracle Institute, who wanted to build a "Peace Pentagon", a proposed interfaith study center and retreat, on the banks of the New River in Independence, Virginia. After George was refused a building permit when the local Board of Supervisors voted to deny the project on health, safety and welfare grounds, attorneys acting on behalf of The Rutherford Institute pursued a legal action to acquire the permit, alleging religious discrimination; eventually the building permit was granted.

=== Freedom of speech ===
In 2012, The Rutherford Institute filed a lawsuit on behalf of Harold Hodge, a man arrested in January 2011 for standing outside the United States Supreme Court Building carrying a sign which read, "The U.S. Gov allows police to illegally murder and brutalize African-Americans and Hispanic people." Other cases include defending an Albemarle High School student's right to wear a National Rifle Association T-shirt to school and contesting the dismissal of a California teacher who referred to "Zionist Jews" during an Occupy Movement protest.

The Rutherford Institute was also involved with the ACLU in defending the 2017 Unite the Right rally effort to hold a rally on August 11 and 12 in Charlottesville's Emancipation Park.

=== Opposition to Government surveillance ===
In 2012, The Rutherford Institute took legal action against the Northside Independent School District in San Antonio, Texas, on behalf of high school student, Andrea Hernandez, who risked consequences from school administrators for refusing to wear a "name badge containing a radio-frequency identification (RFID) chip." The school district sought to increase student attendance rates with tracking devices on students. Attorneys for the Rutherford Institute argued that the school's actions violated Texas' Religious Freedom Act, the First Amendment to the United States Constitution, and the Fourteenth Amendment to the United States Constitution. After the lawsuit in federal court and the negative publicity it generated, the Northside Independent School District abandoned the tracking program.

In 2023, The Rutherford Institute urged the City Council in Charlottesville, Virginia against adopting the use of license plate readers in the Charlottesville Police Department.

In 2023, The Rutherford Institute issued a public warning about Ancestry.com DNA Kits and the "associated privacy risks posed by police and hackers." John W. Whitehead, president of The Rutherford Institute said “The debate over genetic privacy—and when one’s DNA becomes a public commodity outside the protection of the Fourth Amendment’s prohibition on warrantless searches and seizures—is really only beginning,”

=== Search and seizure ===
In 2008, The Rutherford Institute joined a coalition of civil libertarians and activists who called upon President George W. Bush to release a number of Muslim Uighurs who were being detained indefinitely in Guantanamo Bay, Cuba.

In 2010, the group took on a number of cases regarding the Transportation Security Administration's controversial security procedures at American airports. The organization filed a lawsuit in November 2010 against Janet Napolitano, the secretary of the Department of Homeland Security and John Pistole, the head of the Transportation Security Administration, on behalf of airline pilots Michael Roberts and Ann Poe. The pilots objected to being subjected to "whole body imaging" scanners, which reveal the nude body of the subject being searched, as well as a pat-down. John W. Whitehead said of the matter, "Forcing Americans to undergo a virtual strip search as a matter of course in reporting to work or boarding an airplane when there is no suspicion of wrongdoing is a grotesque violation of our civil liberties." The next month The Rutherford Institute filed another lawsuit on the behalf of three passengers who took issue with the TSA screening procedures: a 12-year-old girl placed in a body scanner without parental consent, a man who was subjected to an invasive pat down in his genital area due to an abnormality caused by a childhood injury, and a woman who had undergone a mastectomy and was required to be patted down in her breast area.

In 2010, Whitehead sent a letter to Ken Cuccinelli, the Attorney General of Virginia, decrying his legal opinion that school officials could seize and search student cellphones and laptop computers upon suspicion that a student had broken school rules or the law.

In 2011, the group filed a friend of the court brief in the case U.S. v. Jones, imploring the justices of the U.S. Supreme Court to rule that the placement of a GPS tracking device on the defendant's car without first obtaining a warrant constituted an illegal search. In January 2012 the Supreme Court ruled unanimously that police must obtain a warrant before placing a physical GPS tracking unit on a suspect's car.

Following the 2020 Anti-police protests over the murder of George Floyd, but without mentioning it, Rutherford published an article denouncing no knock warrants and the granting of "qualified immunity" to police. The article argued that Americans live in a "police state" and that "freedom has become fascism" due to the Supreme Court's refusal to uphold the Fourth Amendment to the United States Constitution and limit the police, stating that there is a "nationwide epidemic of court-sanctioned police violence carried out with impunity against individuals posing little or no real threat."

=== Ballot access ===
In July 2014, The Rutherford Institute supported the Libertarian Party of Virginia and alleged that Virginia ballot laws favored "the election chances of Democrat and Republican candidates at the expense of Libertarian Party and independent candidates."
