= Jean Thomassen =

Dutch artist

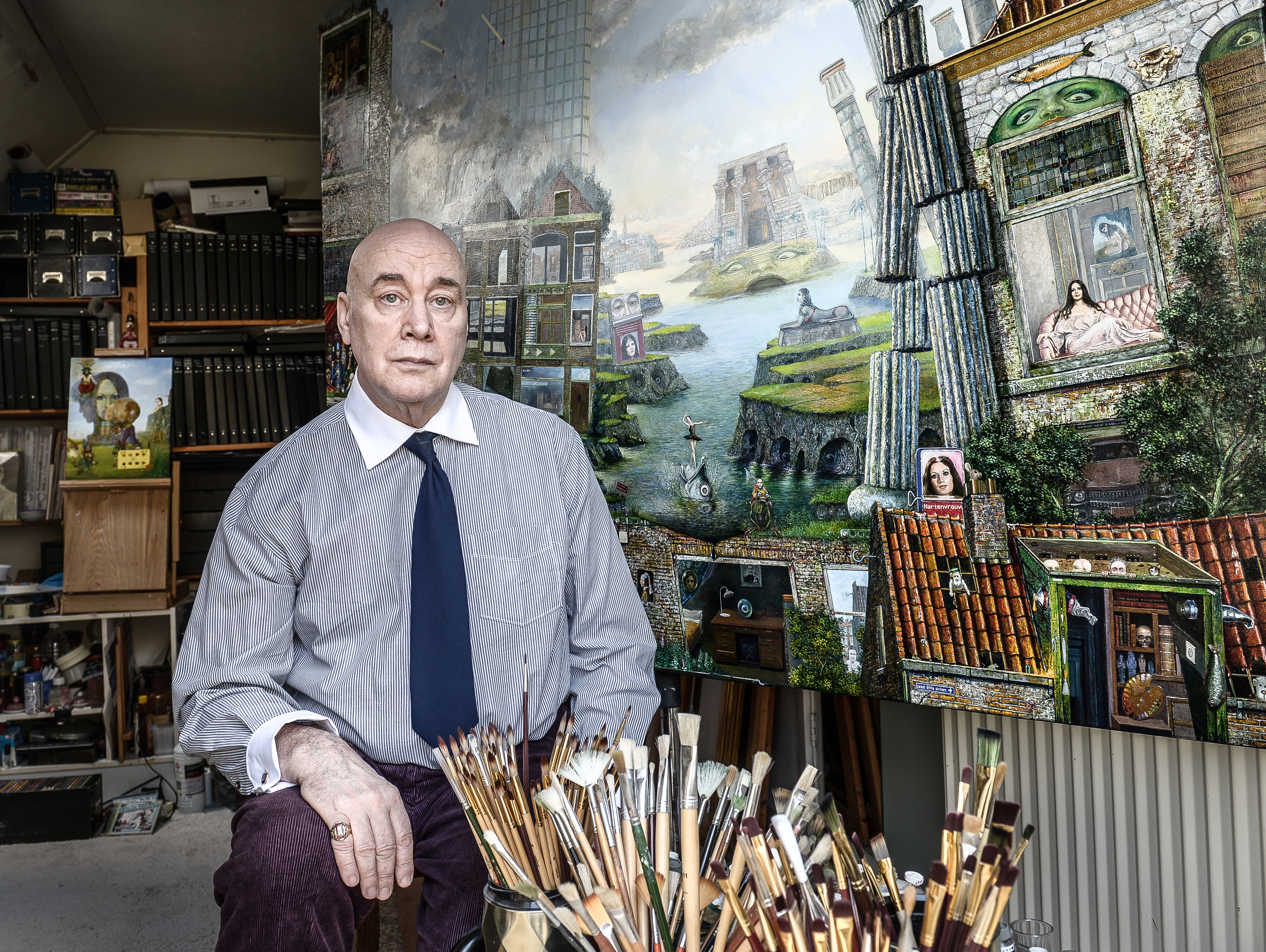
- Jean Thomassen in his studio at Heiloo, The Netherlands
- Born: 5 September 1949 (age 76); The Hague
- Education: Comeniusschool; Populier Gymnasium
- Known for: Painting; Writing
- Movement: Fantastic art
- Awards: Knight in the Order of Orange-Nassau for contribution to Dutch art (2010)
- Website: www.jeanthomassen.nl

Jean Thomassen (born 5 September 1949) is a Dutch artist and writer whose paintings are in an 'absurd realism' style. He lives in Heiloo in the Netherlands.

Absurd realism is a type of art within the broad category of fantastic art. The term was first mentioned in the Netherlands in 1991 in the book 'The Absurd Reality of Jean Thomassen' by the Belgian author Gerard van Hulst.

Jean Thomassen's works in this field include the triptychs Egyptian Triptych (1995) and Last Judgement Day (2006-2011), 28 x Rembrandt (1989), and 1900 & Yesterday (2012-2017). A characteristic of Thomassen's paintings is the many incongruous elements such as skies full of nails and fried eggs, crooked houses with weeping roof tiles, and eyes. In this respect his work has been compared in the press to that of the Dutch painter Hieronymus Bosch (c1450-1516). On 17 November 2008 a number of his works, including Egyptian Triptych, were destroyed when the Daan Enneking collection went up in flames.

In 2010, Jean Thomassen was made a knight in the Order of Orange-Nassau for his contributions to Dutch art. In 2013 his work was awarded a Merit Award in Leipzig Germany, and in 2014 he won the First Prize Palm Award.

== Career ==
Thomassen did not receive formal training to become an artist and initially designed sleeves for Bootleg albums for White Label and Redita Records.

In 1973 Thomassen developed a relationship with the ballerina and actress Ine Veen. Born in 1937, Veen had trained in dance at the Nel Roos Ballet Academy in Amsterdam, and was subsequently contracted by Yvonne Georgi for the Hanover Opera Ballet. Veen became the inspiration of many of his paintings and appeared in many of them. She arranged his debut exhibition at Gallery Artim in The Hague in 1974 and this was followed by Dutch TV film.

Ine Veen also encouraged Thomassen to enter international competitions, resulting in prizes in New York 1988, Toronto 1987, 1988, 1989 and the Biennale of Gabrovo 1989. Critics were initially divided in the assessment of his work: some thought his paintings must be the product of a deranged mind, while others viewed Thomassen as a genius.

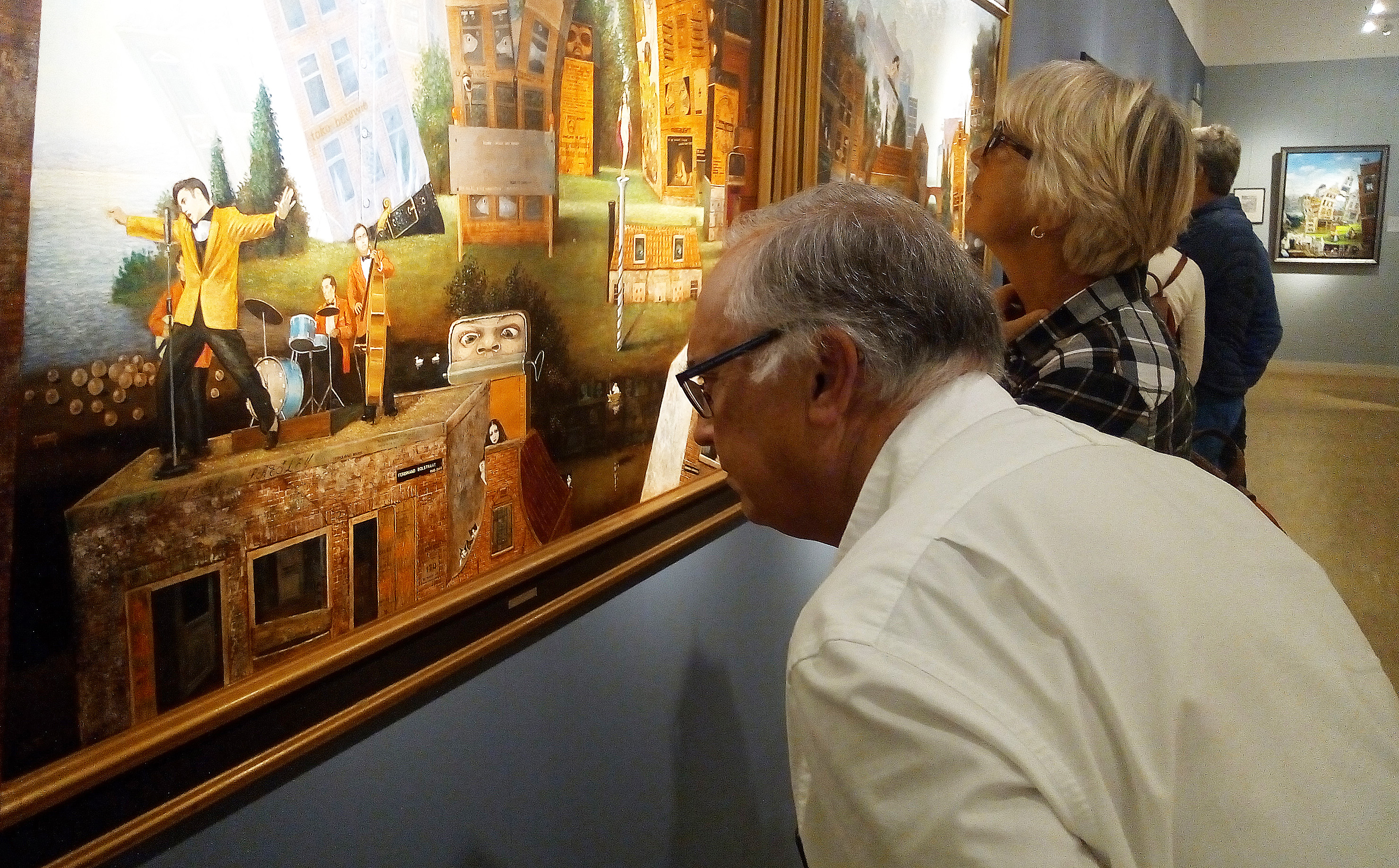
Glenn Janes at Museum Slager, viewing '1900 and Yesterday, No 2' (1989).

In 1991, he held a series of commemorative exhibitions to mark the 60th anniversary of the death of Russian ballerina Anna Pavlova (1881-1931). He wrote a biography of Pavlova in 1995 that received publicity in England and Russia. Other exhibitions followed, including one in 1995 covering at the Markiezenhof Museum in Bergen op Zoom in the Netherlands which also marked the publication of Gerard van Hulst's book 'De absurde realiteit van Jean Thomassen' ('The Absurd Reality of Jean Thomassen).

In 1999, Thomassen exhibited at the Daan Enneking Collection in the West-Fries Museum in Hoorn, followed by a retrospective there in 2001. In 2003 he exhibited for the first time in France at Galerie Archetypes Art International in Hyeres, followed in 2004 by an exhibition of his paintings at the 9th Salon International in Marseille.

== Books ==
Thomassen has written the following books:

- Anna Pavlova, Triumph and Tragedy of a Megastar [Anna Pavlova, triomf en tragedie van een megaster], 1995, ISBN 978-90-6881-042-4
- Old Masters of Tomorrow (the Enneking Collection), 2000, ISBN 978-90-6881-104-9
- Scams in the Art and Antiques Trade [Zwendel in de kunst en antiekhandel], 2007, ISBN 978-90-5911-285-8
- The Gospel of Evil [Het evangelie van het kwaad], 2007, ISBN 978-90-5911-556-9
- Egypt Before and Different [Egypte eerder en anders], 2008, ISBN 978-90-5911-575-0
- Bastards in art [Smeerlappen in de kunst], 2009, ISBN 978-90-5911-599-6
- Mediums and other phenomena, Paranormal or deception? [Mediums en andere fenomenen], 2009, ISBN 978-90-5911-751-8
- Music of the Devil [Muziek van de duivel], 2009, ISBN 978-90-5911-708-2
- Was Adam a Gorilla? [Was Adam een gorilla], 2010, ISBN 978-90-5911-929-1
- Notes on the Holocaust, 2011, ISBN 978-90-5911-696-2
- Curtain up for a real star [Doek op voor een echte ster], 2017, ISBN 978-90-8759-687-3
- 1900 and Yesterday [1900 en gisteren], 2019, ISBN 978-90-8759-830-3
- The Amasis Collection (Foreword), 2020, ISBN 978-0-9566271-7-9
