= Oberto Airaudi =

Italian painter (1950–2013)

- Born: May 29, 1950; Balangero, Italy
- Died: June 24, 2013 (aged 63); Aval (Cuceglio), Italy
- Other name: Falco Tarassaco
- Occupation: Most notable as the founder of the Federation of Damanhur.
- Years active: 1975–2013
- Organizations: Federation of Damanhur
- Known for: Founding the Federation of Damanhur, directing the construction of the Temples of Humankind
- Website: Damanhur.org

Oberto Airaudi (29 May 1950 – 24 June 2013), also commonly known as "Falco Tarassaco", was an Italian new age alchemist, artist, philosopher, author, healer, and the spiritual guide and founder of Damanhur, federation of self-sustaining spiritual communities located primarily in Vidracco, Italy. Airaudi went by the name of Falco Tarassaco (the Italian translation of Hawk Dandelion), based on the Damanurian practice of adopting animal and plant names, which he inspired.

== Biography ==
Oberto Airaudi was born in the town of Balangero, near Turin, Italy.

In 1975, Airaudi and a group of about 25 other people founded the "Horus Center" in Turin, and later the Federation of Damanhur, a New Age commune and eco-village. Beginning in 1978, Airaudi directed construction of the underground facility the Temples of Humankind. Initially in secret, the Temples became public knowledge in 1992, when a former member sued to regain his possessions from the group. Prior to founding the community, he had worked as an insurance agent.

Airaudi died in the Damanhur community of Aval (Cuceglio) of colon cancer after it metastasized to his liver.

== Sources ==
- Ananas, Esperide (2006). Damanhur: The Temples of Humankind. New York: CoSM Press. ISBN 1-55643-577-0.
- Merrifield, Jeff (2006). Damanhur: The Story of the Extraordinary Italian Artistic Community. Santa Cruz: Hanford Mead Publishers. ISBN 1-59275-010-9.

=== Publications ===
- Dying to Learn: First Book of the Initiate. Oberto Airaudi with a Foreword by Laura M. George (Revised English Ed. 2012). The Oracle Institute: ISBN 978-1-937465-018
- Reborn to Live: Second Book of the Initiate. Oberto Airaudi with a Foreword by Alex Grey (Revised English Ed. 2013). The Oracle Institute: ISBN 978-1-937465-056.
- Seven Scarlet Doors: Third Book of the Initiate. Oberto Airaudi with a Foreword by Barbara Marx Hubbard (Revised English Ed. 2013). The Oracle Institute: ISBN 978-1-937465-094
- Bral Talej: Divination Cards. Oberto Airaudi and Shama Viola (2011). The Oracle Institute: UPC 8032937910017
