= Temple of Visions =

Art and evening production company in Los Angeles

Temple of Visions is an American art and event production company, based in Los Angeles. The company is best known for opening the first art gallery dedicated to the International Visionary Art movement, proliferating in the transformational festival phenomenon.

== Beginnings ==
Temple of Visions was established in 2008 by Los Angeles underground artists and curators Jimmy Bleyer & Radhika Hersey. After increasing infatuation with the International Visionary art movement, they curated their first visionary show, Manifest, at Downtown Los Angeles counterculture destination, The Hive Gallery and Studios. The debut show featured well-known artists Alex Grey, Robert Venosa, HR Giger, Martina Hoffmann, Amanda Sage, Pablo Amaringo, Adam Scott Miller, Michael Divine and others.

== Activities ==
In January, 2009 the Temple of Visions Gallery opened next door to its original space at The Hive. Featuring Temple installations and a stage, the gallery and event space was used by the community and helped influence the growing culture. The gallery's intentional blend of art gallery and sacred space helped inspire new galleries opening around the world.

== Events management ==
The gallery closed in 2011, and the Temple of Visions team continues to create exhibition space at festivals from California to Costa Rica and Egypt. Additionally, the Temple team produces large-scale installation productions at events like Burning Man.
