= Yuval Ron Ensemble =

- Origin: Los Angeles, California, United States
- Genres: Sacred Middle Eastern
- Instruments: Oud, duduk, kanoun, harmonium, saz, cumbus, sintir
- Years active: 1999-present
- Website: yuvalronmusic.com/ensemble/

The Yuval Ron Ensemble is a musical group that focuses on traditional sacred Middle Eastern repertoire. The group's stated mission is to “alleviate national, racial, religious and cultural divides by uniting the music and dance of the people of the Middle East into a unique mystical, spiritual and inspiring musical celebration.”

== History and personnel ==
The group was founded in 1999 by composer, producer, and oud player Yuval Ron. The ensemble includes musicians of all three major Abrahamic faiths: Jewish, Muslim, and Christian. As a symbol of harmony, the ensemble perform traditional music and dance with roots in Judaism, Sufism, and the Christian Armenian Church.

The group's members are: Najwa Gibran (vocals), Maya Haddi (vocals), Sukhawat Ali Khan (Qawwali vocals and harmonium), Norik Manoukian (duduk and woodwinds), Virginie Alumyan (kanoun), Jamie Papish (percussion), and David Martinelli (percussion). Ensemble performances often include a visual component as well, with Sufi whirling dervish Aziz or devotional dancer Maya Gabay.

== Major performances ==
The Yuval Ron Ensemble is based in Los Angeles, California, and has performed nationally as well as internationally.

In 2009, the ensemble was invited by the King of Morocco to perform at the International Sacred Music Festival of Fez. In 2008, they performed at the Dalai Lama's "Seeds of Compassion" conference in Seattle.

Other notable performances include the International Oud Festival as a part of a Peace Mission Tour (Jerusalem), World Festival of Sacred Music (Los Angeles), the International Peace Festival (South Korea), as well as concerts in Mexico, Spain, Turkey, and Poland.

== Awards ==
The group has received grants from the National Endowment for the Arts, was honored with the Los Angeles Treasures Award and the Lincoln/Standing Bear Gold Medal from the City of Lincoln, NE in appreciation of its efforts for peace and justice worldwide.

== Discography ==
- Seeker of Truth
- Tree of Life
- Under the Olive Tree
