= Yuval Ron =

Israeli musician

Yuval Ron יובל רון
- Born: Israel
- Genre: Sacred Middle Eastern
- Occupations: Composer, performer, peace activist, producer
- Instruments: Oud, saz, cumbus, sintir
- Member of: Yuval Ron Ensemble
- Website: yuvalronmusic.com

Yuval Ron (Hebrew: יובל רון) is a world music artist, composer, educator, peace activist, and record producer.

Notable compositions include music for the Oscar-winning short film West Bank Story (2007), as well as site-specific commissions for the Getty Museum and others. His world music group, The Yuval Ron Ensemble, focuses on peace issues and interfaith dialogue, and tours internationally, including festival appearances in Israel, Morocco, Turkey, and a performance for the Dalai Lama. Yuval Ron also lectures at major universities on the subjects of sacred Middle Eastern music, spiritual foundations of creativity, and the impact of sound on healing.

== Composition career ==
Yuval Ron began composing professionally for theater and contemporary dance in Israel in the early 1980s. In the late 80s-early 90s, he worked as a composer for promotional videos, theater, television, and dance in Boston and New York. He scored his first feature film, "Urban Jungle," produced in New York, in 1990. In the mid-late 90s, Yuval Ron was a composer for the Fox Kids network in Los Angeles, CA. In 2006, he composed music for the short film "West Bank Story," a musical spoof of "West Side Story" that features two rival gangs of fast food employees – the Israeli "Kosher King" vs. the Palestinian "Hummus Hut". "West Bank Story" won the Academy Award for Best Live Action Short Film in 2007. Other notable scores include scores for PBS Nova ("Breaking the Maya Code"), Proteus, Oliver Twist, The Spiral Staircase, Golda's Balcony, Road to Victory, The Evil That Men Do, In The Name of Honour, Mashhad, and Em Moves.

== Performance career ==
As a performer, Yuval Ron is best known as an oud player and ensemble leader. He also plays the guitar, the Turkish cumbus, saz, and the Moroccan sintir. Yuval Ron founded the Yuval Ron Ensemble in 1999. The group has toured extensively in the US, as well as internationally in Israel, Turkey, Morocco, and Korea. In 2008, the Yuval Ron Ensemble was the featured group in the Gala Concert for the Dalai Lama's initiative Seeds of Compassion in the Seattle Opera Hall, and performed at The United Nations International Day of Peace Concert in 2019.

In 2010, Yuval Ron was a featured presenter at TEDx Conejo, CA, where he narrated a mystical story and accompanied himself with the oud.

== Lecture and teaching career ==
Yuval Ron has given many lectures about sacred Middle Eastern music and the spiritual foundations of creativity at American universities including Yale, UCLA, Johns Hopkins University, MIT, Middlebury College, Brandeis University, Berklee College of Music, University of Chicago, and Pittsburgh University. Since 2009, Yuval Ron has been on the faculty of the Esalen Institute in Big Sur, CA, where he lectures and leads workshops on sacred Middle Eastern music and dance, spirituality and the brain, and related topics. He is also an affiliated artist with the Center for Jewish Culture and Creativity, and a "Guiding Voice" for Seven Pillars – House of Wisdom.

== Writing career ==
Yuval Ron wrote a book entitled "Divine Attunement: Music as a Path to Wisdom." Divine Attunement was published in August 2014 by The Oracle Institute, and was awarded the Gold Medal for the Best Book Award in the Spiritual Category at the Indie Book Awards 2015. The book explores the lives of mystical musical figures from Christian, Jewish, Muslim, and Buddhist traditions. These stories are supplemented by sound meditation exercises, as well as neuroscience explanations for the phenomena described in the book. The book features a foreword by Sufi leader, Pir Zia Inayat Khan.

== Awards and honors ==
- 2020 – Presidential Gold Medal Award for volunteering – for founding and leading the charity non-profit organization Inspired Sound Initiative.
- 2015 – Gold Medal Award for Best book – Divine Attunement: Music as a Path to Wisdom
- 2012 – Lincoln/Standing Bear Gold Medal
- 2009 – "Seeker of Truth" - Silver Medal for Excellence - "Best impact of music experimental, performance art and art films." Park City Film Music Festival
- 2009 – Park City Film Music Festival Silver Medal for Excellence
- 2008 – International Archaeological Film Festival Grand Prize (for "Breaking the Maya Code")
- 2008 – Audience Award for Best Documentary, Red Rock Film Festival, Springdale, Utah (for "Breaking the Maya Code")
- 2007 – “West Bank Story” – Academy Award (Oscar) for Best Live Action Short Los Angeles, CA
- 2007 – "Road to Victory" – Best Original Motion Picture Soundtrack (Moondance Gaia Award) Moondance Film Festival, Boulder, Colorado
- 2007 – “Human Relations Award for Entertainment Leadership and Tikkun Olam: Repairing our World” – Valley Interfaith Council, Los Angeles, CA.
- 2006 – Peace Maker Award, The Rotary Club of Newbury Park, CA
- 2004 – Los Angeles Treasures Award
- 2004 – National Endowment for the Arts

== Artistic Accomplishments ==
- 2020 – Created the musical score for "Rose River Memorial," a national COVID-19 memorial art installation by artist Marcos Lutyens. The installation was featured at the Building Bridges Art Exchange in Santa Monica, California.
- 2020 – Performed music for the 37th Kotohajime, a site-specific New Year performance organized by Hirokazu Kosaka at the Japan America Center.
- 2020 – Release of "Four Divine States of Mind" album to rave reviews worldwide
- 2019 – A Concert for Peace through Climate Action - Featured performer with the Yuval Ron Ensemble at the Interfaith Chapel in Rochester, NY
- 2019 – The United Nations International Day of Peace Concert - featured performer with the Yuval Ron Ensemble at the Old Dutch Church in Kingston, NY
- 2019 – Holiday Celebration TV Special - Featured performer with the Yuval Ron Ensemble at the Dorothy Chandler Paviliion, live broadcast of PBS KCET TV.
- 2018 – Peace mission concert tour to Republics of Georgia and Armenia.
- 2017 – Peace mission concert tour to Israel
- 2016 – Peace mission concert tour to India

== Discography ==
- Four Divine States of Mind (Metta Mindfulness Music)
- Vibrant Prana (Metta Mindfulness Music)
- Sweet Sweet Sleep, Vol I-III (Metta Mindfulness Music)
- Voyage Through the Chakras (Yuval Ron)
- Metta Music Medicine Series, Vol I-VI (Metta Mindfulness Music)
- The Evil That Men Do (Yuval Ron – soundtrack)
- In the Name of Honor (Yuval Ron – soundtrack)
- Healing Sounds for Yoga, Mindfulness & Creativity (Yuval Ron)
- Film Music of Yuval Ron: 20 Years of Innovative Scores (Yuval Ron)
- Lay Down Your Vow (Yuval Ron)
- Everywhere Nowhere (LAX) (Yuval Ron)
- Ancient Wisdom & Modern Sounds for Health and Healing (Yuval Ron)
- Six Healing Sounds (Yuval Ron)
- Music for Deep Movement Vol 1 (Yuval Ron)
- Rilke: Searching for the Inner Soul (Yuval Ron and Mark Waldman)
- Oud Prayers on the Road to St. Jacques (Yuval Ron)
- In the Shallows (Yuval Ron)
- One
- Music for Deep Movement, Vol. 1 (Yuval Ron)
- In Between the Heartbeat (Yuval Ron)
- One Truth (Omar Faruk Tekbilek, produced and co-written by Yuval Ron)
- Proteus (Yuval Ron – soundtrack)
- West Bank Story (Yuval Ron – soundtrack)
- Breaking the Maya Code (Yuval Ron – soundtrack)
- Em Moves Director: Hanna Wise Heiting
- Dot the I Director: Mathew Parkhill, Alquima Cinema (source music, songs)
