= Michael Matthew Kaylor =

English professor

- Occupation: associate professor

Academic work
- Era: 21st-century
- Discipline: English
- Sub-discipline: Uranian poetry
- Institutions: Masaryk University
- Notable works: Secreted Desires: Major Uranians: Hopkins, Pater and Wilde (2006); Lad's Love: An Anthology of Uranian Poetry and Prose (2010)

Michael Matthew Kaylor is an associate professor of English at Masaryk University and researcher of Uranian poetry. He wrote Secreted Desires: Major Uranians: Hopkins, Pater and Wilde (2006).

== Career ==
In 2010, Kaylor published Lad's Love: An Anthology of Uranian Poetry and Prose, a two-volume anthology containing the works of 47 authors. The book is the first anthology of Uranian poetry to be published since 1924, when Men and Boys was published. Its production started after an earlier scholar of the field wrote that a comprehensive anthology of the literary movement had never been made.

Kaylor edited a 2007 edition of Forrest Reid's 1905 novel The Garden God, another 2009 edition of Edward Perry Warren's Defence of Uranian Love and wrote a two-volume biography of Warren titled The Collected Works & Commissioned Biography of Edward Perry Warren (2013). He also co-wrote Alternatives in Biography: Writing Lives in Diverse English-language Contexts (2011, originally titled Literární biografie jako křižovatka žánrů).
