= Torri Superiore =

Torri Superiore

The medieval village of Torri Superiore (13th century) has been described as "a little jewel of popular architecture." It is located in the Liguria in Italy, near Ventimiglia (county of Imperia), a few kilometres from the Mediterranean Sea and the French border. Its complex structure is developed on eight levels, with three main buildings separated by two partially covered inner alleys.

Built completely in stone over the course of many centuries, the hamlet is composed of 160 rooms with vaulted ceilings (either barrel or cross vaults), linked with each other by an intricate and amazing labyrinth of stairways, terraces and alleys. The total length of the village is 50 metres along the north–south axis, and 30 metres along the east–west axis. The total covered area is close to 3000 square metres. The stone used for the buildings is of local origin and was obtained from marine deposits present in the valley, or from the Bevera riverbed. The natural lime used in the mortar came from stones also found in the riverbed, where the sand was extracted.

Torri Superiore has been called by some a labyrinth or a fortress, and offers a remarkable interest for its compactness and its state of preservation. Today it is mostly restored and open to ecologically minded visitors for cultural initiatives and group activities.

== History ==
The village of Torri is mentioned for the first time in a document dated in 1073 with the sentence: "Actum in castro ubi Ture dicitur" (Cais, "Contea di Ventimiglia"). The origin of the settlement of Torri Superiore is uncertain, and may date back to the late 13th century, a time of great social and religious unrest. This would explain its peculiar appearance, a stronghold that could offer protection to its few inhabitants, and is remarkable for its height (eight levels from the foundations to the roofs) and width.

The latest parts of the hamlet were presumably built around the end of the 18th century, when the village reached its greatest population. Traces remain of communal living, a large hall used possibly as a common kitchen, an open air oven, and an intricate, closely knit pattern of rooms and terraces that create unexpected and charming effects.

== The restoration: New life in the village ==
During the course of the last century, the village was gradually abandoned to decay, slowly turning into a ghost town with its beautiful towers almost completely deserted and in a state of ruin. In the early 90s, a new group of people approached Torri Superiore with the idea to restore it, create homes for a community of residents, and design a careful and well thought-out “recycling plan”, based on the respect for the original historical character of the buildings and for the surrounding environment. In the course of several years, a detailed study of the structure has led to the creation of a complex restoration programme that preserves and enhances the peculiarity of the medieval village. Small local firms, supported by volunteer efforts of all members and residents, did a large part of the building work.

Since 1997, 14 residential units have been restored out of the 20 planned, and an ample part of the cultural centre, property of the Association, has been completed.

Torri Superiore

View to olive terraces

A portal

Interior Torri Superiore
