= Mischtechnik =

Method of painting

Mischtechnik or mixed technique is a term spanning various methods of layering paint, including the usage of different substances. The term gained popularity after Max Doerner's 1921 book The Materials of the Artist and Their Use in Painting: With Notes on the Techniques of the Old Masters However, Doerner made some conclusions about the usage by painters and Mischtechnik which today are no longer considered completely accurate.

== Egg tempera ==
Mischtechnik can be a method of painting with egg tempera, used in combination with oil-based paints and resins to render a luminous, resonant realism. The egg yolk of the egg tempera is a naturally occurring emulsion of water and oil. As such, the old masters found ways of extending the natural advantages of its emulsion to create lean, siccative, smoothly transitional, semi-transparent layers of paint. The visual effects created by working in the mixed technique essentially rely upon the phenomenon of light refracting through many subsequent layers of paint.

One common approach is to transpose the main compositional elements of a value study onto a panel using India ink, then slowly build up volume by alternating egg tempera with an overall glaze of oil paints mixed with resin, producing a jewel-like effect. The technique can be very time-consuming and demanding. It is unforgiving of pentimenti, yet full of delightful surprises, since many unexpected colors can naturally arise during the ongoing glazing process.

== History ==
In the twentieth century artists such as Otto Dix, Ernst Fuchs and Egon von Vietinghoff, as well as Surrealist and visionary artists such as, Robert Venosa, Philip Rubinov Jacobson, Brigid Marlin or Mati Klarwein, used the technique. Nicolas Wacker taught his own version of the technique at the École des Beaux-Arts in Paris during the late 1960s and 1970s. Many contemporary painters credit their knowledge of the technique to him.

== See also ==
- Glaze (painting technique)
- Old Master
- Oil painting
