= Temples of Humankind =

Italian underground structures

Coordinates: 45.417859°N 7.747246°E

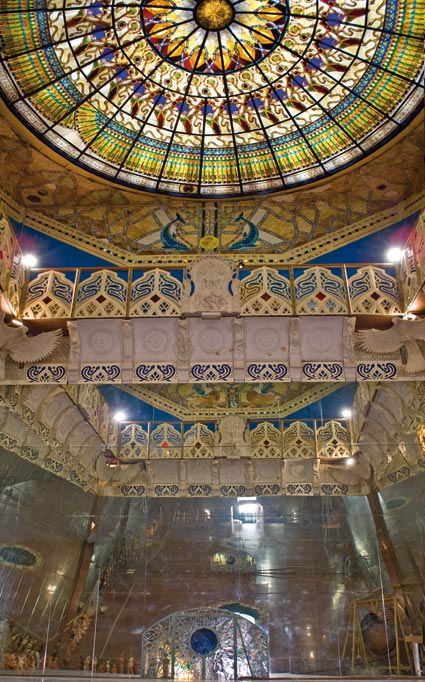
The Hall of Mirrors

The Temples of Humankind are a collection of subterranean temples buried 30 metres (100 ft) underground built by the Federation of Damanhur. They are decorated in several motifs stressing peaceful human collaboration. The Temples are located in the foothills of the Alps in northern Italy, 50 kilometres (30 mi) from Turin, in the valley of Valchiusella.

The temples were created under the direction of Oberto Airaudi who, having claimed visions of ancient temples at age 10 from a previous life, began excavation and building in August 1978. By 1991 most of the chambers were reportedly complete when Italian police, acting on a tip from villagers, conducted a raid on the Temples. However, since the temples were so well hidden, police were unable to locate them until state prosecutor Bruno Tinti threatened "show us these temples or we will dynamite the entire hillside." Eventually the Italian government reportedly gave them retroactive excavation and erection privileges and the Temples are now open to visitors.

== Structure ==
Parts of the Temples:

- Hall of Water – dedicated to the feminine principle, it is in the shape of a chalice and invites receptivity
- Blue Hall – for meditation on social matters and is used as a place of inspiration and reflection
- Hall of Earth – dedicated to the masculine principle, to the earth as an element and planet and to past and future reincarnations
- Hall of Metals – represents the different ages and developmental stages of humankind and the shadow elements of the human psyche
- Labyrinth Hall – showing Interfaith worship through the centuries, uniting different cultures and peoples
- Hall of Spheres – positioned where 3 synchronic lines merge, inviting planetary contact and transmission of messages, ideas and dreams to create harmony between nations
- Hall of Mirrors – dedicated to the sky, air and light, solar energy, strength and life. There are 4 altars to earth, water, air and fire
