= The Windhover =

Poem by Gerard Manley Hopkins, written 1877

"The Windhover" is a sonnet by Gerard Manley Hopkins (1844–1889). It was written on 30 May 1877, but not published until 1918, when it was included as part of the collection Poems of Gerard Manley Hopkins. Hopkins dedicated the poem "To Christ our Lord".

The Windhover

I caught this morning morning's minion, king-
dom of daylight's dauphin, dapple-dawn-drawn Falcon, in his riding
Of the rolling level underneath him steady air, and striding
High there, how he rung upon the rein of a wimpling wing
In his ecstasy! then off, off forth on swing,
As a skate's heel sweeps smooth on a bow-bend: the hurl and gliding
Rebuffed the big wind. My heart in hiding
Stirred for a bird, – the achieve of, the mastery of the thing!

Brute beauty and valour and act, oh, air, pride, plume, here
Buckle! AND the fire that breaks from thee then, a billion
Times told lovelier, more dangerous, O my chevalier!

No wonder of it: shéer plód makes plough down sillion
Shine, and blue-bleak embers, ah my dear,
Fall, gall themselves, and gash gold-vermilion.

"Windhover" is another name for the common kestrel (Falco tinnunculus). The name refers to the bird's ability to hover in midair while hunting prey. In the poem, the narrator admires the bird as it hovers in the air, suggesting that it controls the wind as a man may control a horse. The bird then suddenly swoops downwards and "rebuffed the big wind". The bird can be viewed as a metaphor for Christ or of divine epiphany.

Hopkins called "The Windhover" "the best thing [he] ever wrote". It commonly appears in anthologies and has lent itself to many interpretations.
