= Men and Boys =

1924 book

Men and Boys: An Anthology
- Editor: Edward Mark Slocum
- Language: English
- Publication date: 1924
- Publication place: United States

Men and Boys: An Anthology is a rare anthology of Uranian poetry anonymously published in 1924 by American chemist Edward Mark Slocum (1886-1945). It is the first anthology focused on homosexual literature to be published in the United States.

The authorship of the book was unknown until about half a century after the book's publication, when an academic investigation traced the identity of the self-described "technical man" who edited the book to Slocum, a chemistry graduate from the University of Tennessee who had invented a number of rubber-related and other patents. As of 1970, only seven copies of the book were known to exist.

The book was followed by Lads o' the Sun (1928), also anonymously published.
