= Brigid Marlin =

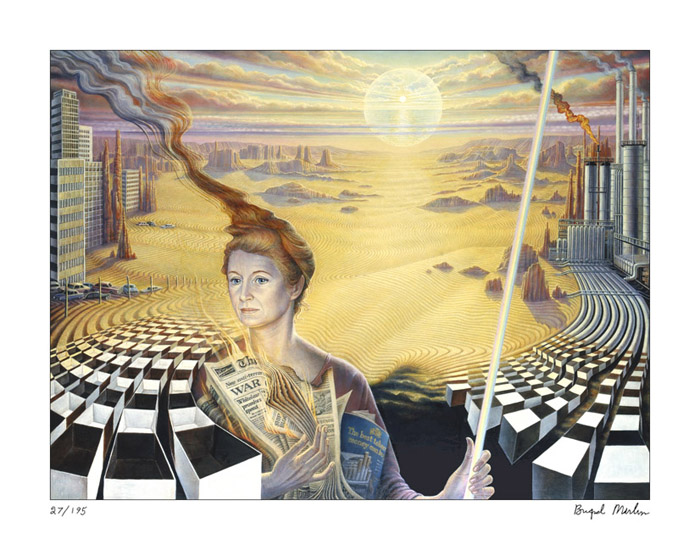
'The Rod' limited edition fine art print by Brigid Marlin (details).

Brigid Marlin (born 16 January 1936, Washington, D.C.) is an American artist based in Hertfordshire, UK. She studied in Dublin, Montreal, New York, Paris and Vienna where, under the guidance of the Austrian artist Ernst Fuchs, she learned the oil and egg tempera technique (Mischtechnik) of the Flemish and Italian Renaissance painters Jan van Eyck and Giovanni Bellini. In 1961 she founded the Inscape Group, which subsequently became the Society for Art of Imagination.

Marlin's paintings typically feature visionary and psychic subjects, often with scriptural themes akin to the Vienna School of Fantastic Realism. One of her best-known paintings, 'The Rod', won the 1974 Visions of the Future competition and was greatly admired by J. G. Ballard, who later commissioned her to reproduce the Belgian surrealist Paul Delvaux's two 'lost' paintings: 'The Rape' and 'The Mirror'. Her portrait of Ballard was acquired by the National Portrait Gallery, London, in 1989, and she has also painted portraits of the Dalai Lama and Queen Elizabeth.

== Personal life ==
Marlin is the daughter of artist and children's author Hilda van Stockum. She married in 1957, had three sons (the eldest of whom died in 1979) and divorced in 1980. These experiences are documented in her books From East to West: Awakening to a Spiritual Search and A Meaning for Danny.

== Books ==
- 1989 - From East to West: Awakening to a Spiritual Search (Brigid Marlin) (Fount) ISBN 0-00-622762-7
- 1991 - Paintings in the Mische Technique
- 1999 - Visions of Venice (Christine Marlin, Brigid Marlin) (Byronic Books) ISBN 0-9514571-1-X
- 2007 - Metamorphosis (being Art) ISBN 978-0-9803231-0-8
- 2007 - Clara and the Computer Mouse (Brigid Marlin) ISBN 978-0-9557580-1-0
- 2012 - A Meaning for Danny (Brigid Marlin) (Infinity Publishing) ISBN 978-0741466921
- 2022 - Techniques in Painting Learning from the Dutch Masters (Brigid Marlin) (ISBN 978-1-78994-058-9 eBook 978-1-78994-059-6)

== Awards ==
- 1974 - Visions of the Future, first prize for 'The Rod'
- 1984 - International Art Appreciation Award, USA, first prize
- 1988 - International Painting Competition, Dublin, first prize
