= Federation of Damanhur =

Religious community

The Federation of Damanhur
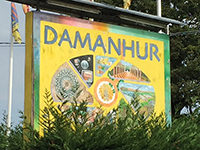
- Formation: 1975
- Type: New Religious Movement
- Headquarters: Vidracco, Piedmont, Italy.
- Coordinates: 45.416915°N 7.747598°E
- Founder: Oberto Airaudi

The Federation of Damanhur, often called simply Damanhur, is a federation of self-sustaining communities, ecovillage, situated in the Piedmont region of northern Italy about 50 kilometres (31 mi) north of the city of Turin. It is located in the foothills of the Alps in the Chiusella Valley, bordering on the Gran Paradiso National Park. The community has its own constitution and currency, the Credito.

Damanhur is named after the Egyptian city of Damanhur, which was the site of a temple dedicated to Horus.

The Federation of Damanhur was founded in 1975 by Oberto Airaudi with 12 of his close friends, and by year 2000 the number had grown to 800. It has communities and centers in Europe, America, Australia, and Japan.

The Temples of Humankind are a collection of subterranean temples built by the citizens of the Federation of Damanhur, and they are some of the largest underground temples in the world.

== Citizens of Damanhur ==
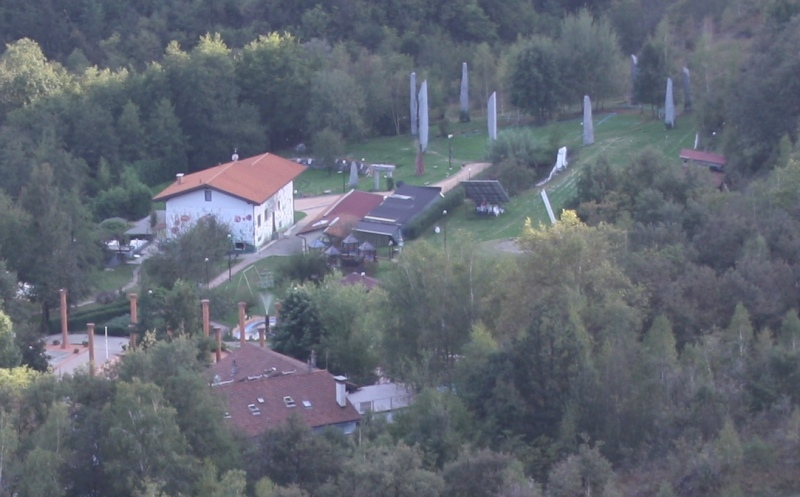
Damanhur

The constitution began with three bodies of Damanhur: The School of Meditation (ritual tradition) Social (social theory, social realization) and The Game of Life (experimentation and dynamics, life as a game, change). A fourth body was recently added, Technarcate (individual inner refinement).

Citizens participate in one of four levels, depending on their desired involvement: A, B, C, or D. Class A citizens share all resources and live on site full-time. Class B citizens contribute to financial goals and live on site a minimum of 3 days a week. Class C and D citizens live anywhere. Class A & B citizens participate fully in The School of Meditation, Social, and the Game of Life. Class C citizens participate fully in The School of Meditation.

Citizens participate in one of several ways, depending on their personal nature. Ways include the Way of the Oracle, the Way of the Monk, the Way of the Knight, the Way of Health, the Way of the Word, the Way of Art & Work, and many others. Most citizens live in houses of 10-20 people each, federated together into the Federation of Damanhur.

From 1983 onwards, members assumed animal names, such as Sparrow, Prawn, or Mole.

== Controversy over allegations of cult-like practices ==
Since May 2009, a website called Damanhur Inside Out has hosted anonymous testimonials from people claiming to be ex-members of the Damanhur community, and articles relating to legal controversy around the Foundation and its founder. In the 2007 assessment of Patrizia Santovecchi, the President of the National Psychological Abuses Observatory (Osservatorio Nazionale Abusi Psicologici, O.N.A.P.), Damanhur shares characteristics typical of psychologically abusive cults. These characteristics include barriers to leaving freely, siege syndrome, in which outsiders are portrayed as enemies constituted by negative energies; suppression of criticism, imposition of obedience, estrangement from family members, depersonalization, and submission to the will of the guru. A 2018 analysis of interviews with ex-members echoed these themes, showing that their process of disillusionment with and departure from the community usually took several years and could be "torturous".

Damanhur have publicly responded to criticism by describing themselves as an "ethical cult". Academics have noted that Damanhur has undergone changes since the death of the founder in 2013, and become more outward-facing. Websites have become an important means by which the Foundation is "advertising and legitimizing" itself as an 'Exemplary Utopia'.
