= Inscape and instress =

Poetical concepts of Gerard Manley Hopkins

Inscape and instress are complementary and enigmatic concepts about individuality and uniqueness derived by the poet Gerard Manley Hopkins from the ideas of the medieval philosopher Duns Scotus. Inscape has been rendered variously as: external design, aesthetic conception, intrinsic beauty, the intrinsic form of a thing, a form perceived in nature, the individual self, the expression of the inner core of individuality, the peculiar inner nature of things and persons, expressed in form and gesture, and an essence or identity embodied in a thing. These twin concepts are what his most famous poems are about.

[Hopkins] felt that everything in the universe was characterized by what he called inscape, the distinctive design that constitutes individual identity. This identity is not static but dynamic. Each being in the universe 'selves,' that is, enacts its identity. And the human being, the most highly selved, the most individually distinctive being in the universe, recognizes the inscape of other beings in an act that Hopkins calls instress, the apprehension of an object in an intense thrust of energy toward it that enables one to realize specific distinctiveness. Ultimately, the instress of inscape leads one to Christ, for the individual identity of any object is the stamp of divine creation on it.

This is related to a logocentric theology and the Imago Dei. A logocentric theology of creation is based on correlation of the Genesis account and John 1. Since all creation is by the Word (divine fiat) human identity in God's image is grounded in God's speech and no two creation words are ever spoken alike. (Note: While it is true that "logos" also means "word" in the conventional sense of "speech", in John it refers not to the "divine fiat" ("Let there be Light" etc.), but to Christ as the second person of the Trinity. As the first quotation from the Norton Anthology states: "Ultimately, the inscape of instress leads one to Christ".) This idea is reflected by J. R. R. Tolkien who compares the Creator to a perfect prism and creation to the refraction of perfect light. Tolkien writes,

'Dear Sir,' I said – 'Although now long estranged,
Man is not wholly lost nor wholly changed
Dis-graced he may be, yet is not de-throned,
and keeps the rags of lordship once he owned:
Man, Sub-creator, the refracted Light
through whom is splintered from a single White
to many hues, and endlessly combined
in living shapes that move from mind to mind.

The idea is strongly embraced by the Trappist monk and author Thomas Merton who admired both Scotus and Hopkins. In New Seeds of Contemplation Merton equates the unique "thingness" of a thing, its inscape, to sanctity. Merton writes,

"No two created beings are exactly alike. And their individuality is no imperfection. On the contrary, the perfection of each created thing is not merely its conformity to an abstract type but in its own individual identity with itself."

The result is that holiness itself is grounded in God's creation, his call, and not in a Platonic ideal. To the extent that any "thing" (including humans) honors God's unique idea of them they are holy. Holiness thus connects to "vocation" (from the Latin vocare for "voice") in two ways. First, God creates through the word; and second, when being responds rightly to God's speech by expressing his unique word the result is Holiness.

== An example ==
"As kingfishers catch fire" by G. M. Hopkins:

As kingfishers catch fire, dragonflies draw flame;
As tumbled over rim in roundy wells
Stones ring; like each tucked string tells, each hung bell's
Bow swung finds tongue to fling out broad its name;
Each mortal thing does one thing and the same:
Deals out that being indoors each one dwells;
Selves — goes itself; myself it speaks and spells,
Crying Whát I dó is me: for that I came.

I say móre: the just man justices;
Keeps grace: thát keeps all his goings graces;
Acts in God's eye what in God's eye he is —
Chríst — for Christ plays in ten thousand places,
Lovely in limbs, and lovely in eyes not his
To the Father through the features of men's faces.

In this poem inscape is exemplified by the kingfisher doing its unique kingfishery thing, each stone and each bell is heard making its own unique sound: unique because each stone and each bell is different. The judge does his judgey thing, and inscape is seen to come into being through performance of each individual's perfect birthright. Eyes are lovely because each is unique and leads us to God by ten thousand different routes.

== The central paradox ==
Hopkins's poems which delineate inscape and instress typically celebrate how an immutable Deity continually creates and recreates a living world of infinite variety and change. For Hopkins, this world of ostensible mutability paradoxically points to the unchanging God who “fathers [it] forth.” The religious aspects of inscape are not simply nailed onto his Oxford tutor's ideas of individuation from which they were derived: they are nailed through the hands of Christ onto the cross. This tutor, Walter Pater, was highly influential, but agnostic in his beliefs. Similar to Pater's Conclusion to The Renaissance, Hopkins's vision of the physical world in his poem “Pied Beauty” is one of “perpetual motion.” For Hopkins, the responsibility of establishing and maintaining order within the physical world does not lie with the individual observer as Pater maintained, but rather with the eternal Creator himself.

In a highly relevant way, this paradox echoes that of modern-day naturalists who celebrate how the immutable building blocks of DNA continually combine and recombine to produce a living world of infinite variety and change. Modern readings of Hopkins's poems stress this correspondence without necessarily resolving the inherent contradiction of reading religious poetry from an agnostic standpoint.

== The central enigma ==
Hopkins regarded "The Windhover" as his poem that best expressed his conception of inscape.

To Christ our Lord

I caught this morning morning's minion, king-
dom of daylight's dauphin, dapple-dawn-drawn Falcon, in his riding
Of the rolling level underneath him steady air, and striding
High there, how he rung upon the rein of a wimpling wing
In his ecstasy! then off, off forth on swing,
As a skate's heel sweeps smooth on a bow-bend: the hurl and gliding
Rebuffed the big wind. My heart in hiding
Stirred for a bird, – the achieve of, the mastery of the thing!

Brute beauty and valour and act, oh, air, pride, plume, here
Buckle! AND the fire that breaks from thee then, a billion
Times told lovelier, more dangerous, O my chevalier!

No wonder of it: shéer plód makes plough down sillion
Shine, and blue-bleak embers, ah my dear,
Fall, gall themselves, and gash gold-vermilion.

This falcon is not a delightful lamb-like animal, but a ruthless and proud killing machine whose inscape it is to destroy other inscapes of lesser animals. How can this relate to the Prince of Peace to whom the poem is dedicated? Poets from different generations have wrestled with this problem with various conclusions. For Hopkins, living in a rising tide of disbelief, no simple answer could be given, perhaps because any valid answer needed to be lived rather than declared, and as he lived his life through to the period of the last 'terrible sonnets' he became more human and more prone to despair and less inclined to write about inscape.

== See also ==
- Inscape
- Epiphany (feeling)
