= Society for Art of Imagination =

Artist collective founded in 1961

The Society for Art of Imagination (AOI) is an international artists' society whose stated mission is to promote art of vision and craftsmanship. It has branches all over the world, and the American branch is a registered charity. AOI is affiliated with many other visionary art groups, including the Fantastic Art Centre in South Africa.

AOI was founded in 1961 by a group of artists from England who called themselves the Inscape Group, among them Diana Hesketh, Peter Holland, Brigid Marlin, Jack Ray and Steve Snell. Some of AOI's Honorary Art Members are Ernst Fuchs, H.R. Giger, Robert Venosa, Martina Hoffmann, Alex Grey, Laurie Lipton, De Es, Michel de Saint Ouen, Otto Rapp, Lukas Kandl and Ingo Swann.

AOI holds annual art shows all over the world. AOI also publishes the magazine Inscape. Artists are welcome to join.

== See also ==
- Fantastic art
- Inscape (visual art)
