= Chiusella =

River in Piedmont, Italy

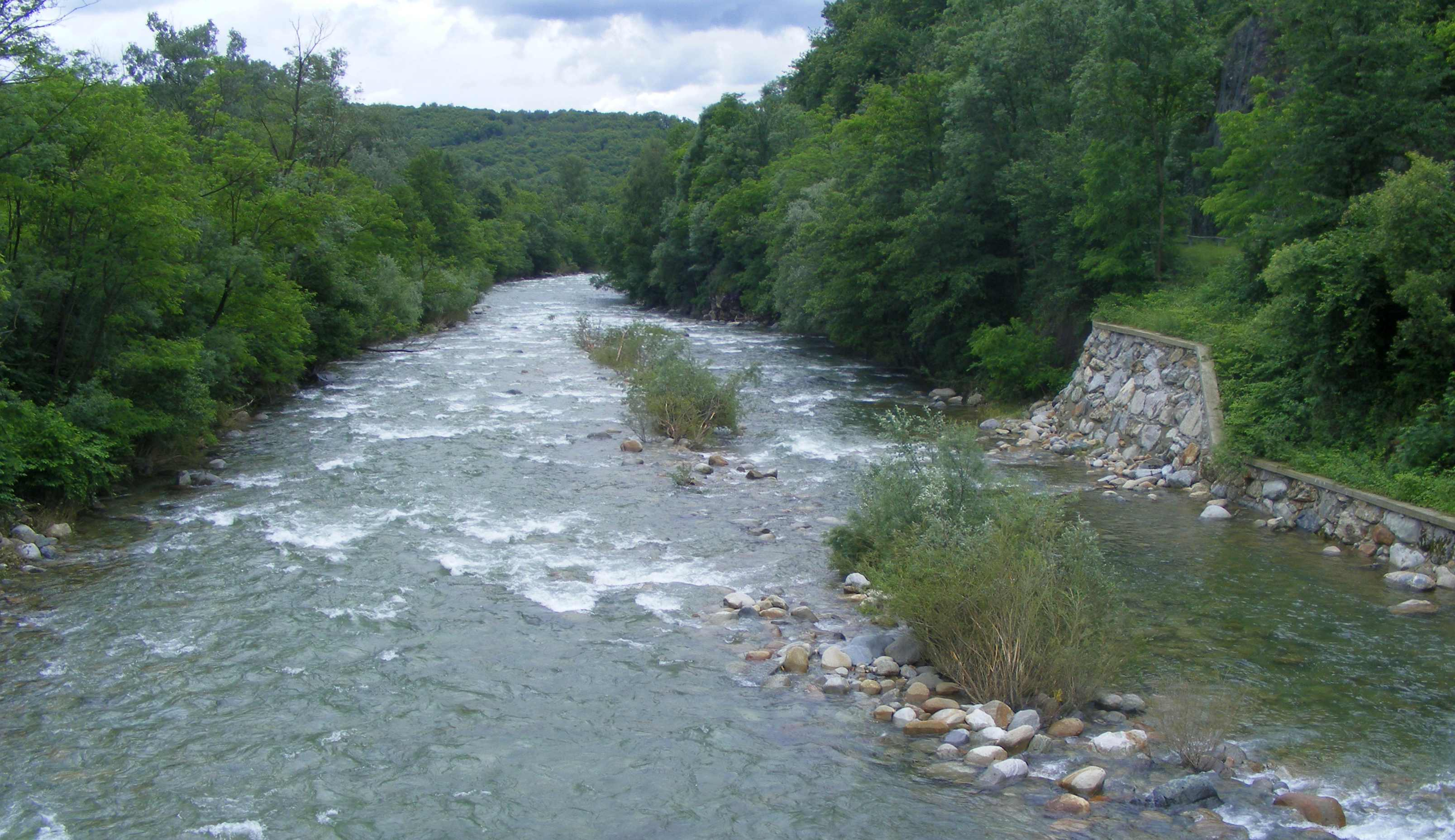
- The Chiusella between Vistrorio and Issiglio

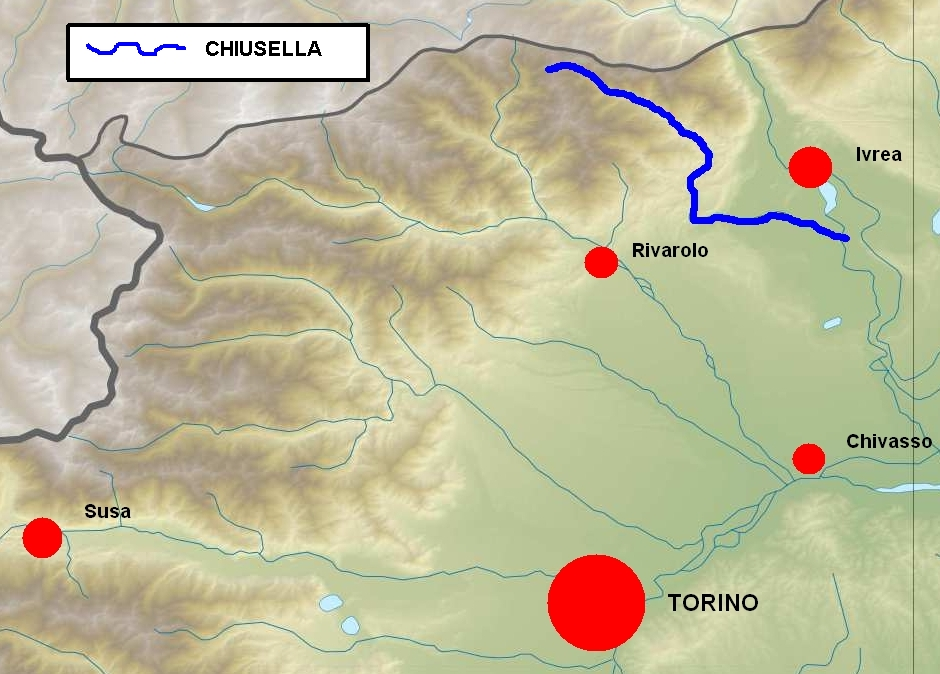
- Location within the province of Turin

Location
- Country: Italy: province of Turin

Physical characteristics
- Source
  - location: Monte Marzo
  - elevation: around 2,300 m (7,500 ft)
- Mouth: Dora Baltea
  - coordinates: 45°24′10″N 7°54′54″E
  - elevation: 223 m (732 ft)
- Length: 41.2 km (25.6 mi)
- Basin size: 212.9 km^{2} (82.2 sq mi)
- Discharge
  - average: (mouth) 6.1 m^{3}/s (220 cu ft/s)

Basin features
- Progression: Dora Baltea→ Po→ Adriatic Sea
- Tributaries
  - left: rio Dondogna, torrente Tarva, torrente Bersella, rio Quaglia, rio Ribes
  - right: rio Sportore, rio Ricordone, rio Trueisa, torrente Savenca

The Chiusella (Piedmontese: Ciusèila) is a 41-kilometre (25 mi) long river in the Piedmont region of Italy.

== Geography ==
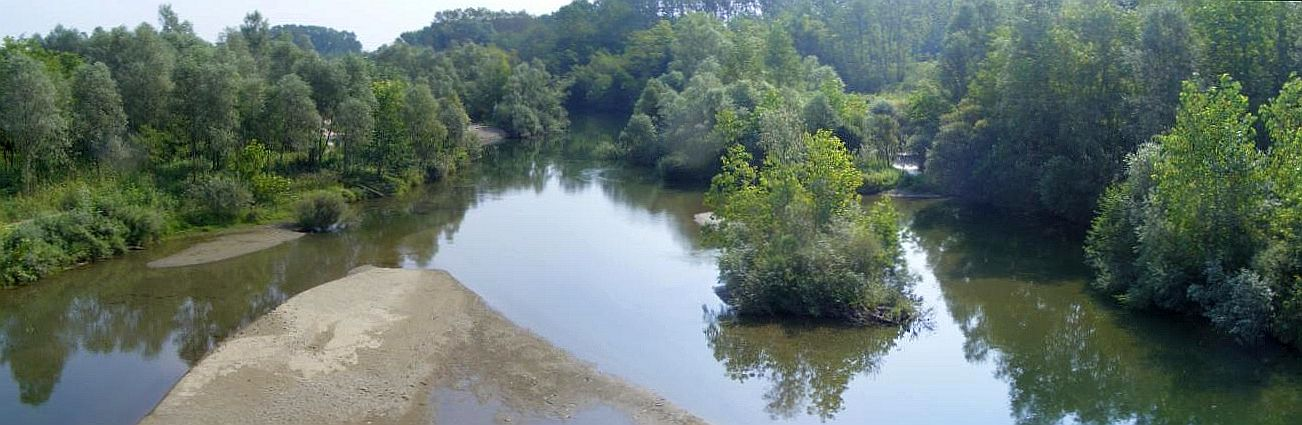
The Chiusella in the plain near Romano Canavese

The Chiusella starts in the Graian Alps near Mount Marzo and Bocchetta delle Oche, a mountain pass connecting its valley with Val Soana. Flowing initially from NW to SE it reaches Traversella and the permanently inhabited part of the valley. In the territory of Issiglio it receives from the right side the waters of the Savenca, its main tributary. Just downstream from this confluence, the Chiusella is blocked by a dam forming the Lake Gurzia. Flowing eastwards it forms a canyon and leaves the mountains entering the plain; near Strambino it finally flows into the Dora Baltea.

== Tributaries ==
- Left-bank tributaries:
  - torrente Dondogna;
  - torrente Tarva;
  - torrente Bersella;
  - rio Quaglia;
  - rio Ribes (formerly Ri Bes).
- Right-bank tributaries:
  - rio Sportore;
  - rio Ricordone;
  - rio Trueisa;
  - torrente Savenca.

== The bridges on the Chiusella ==
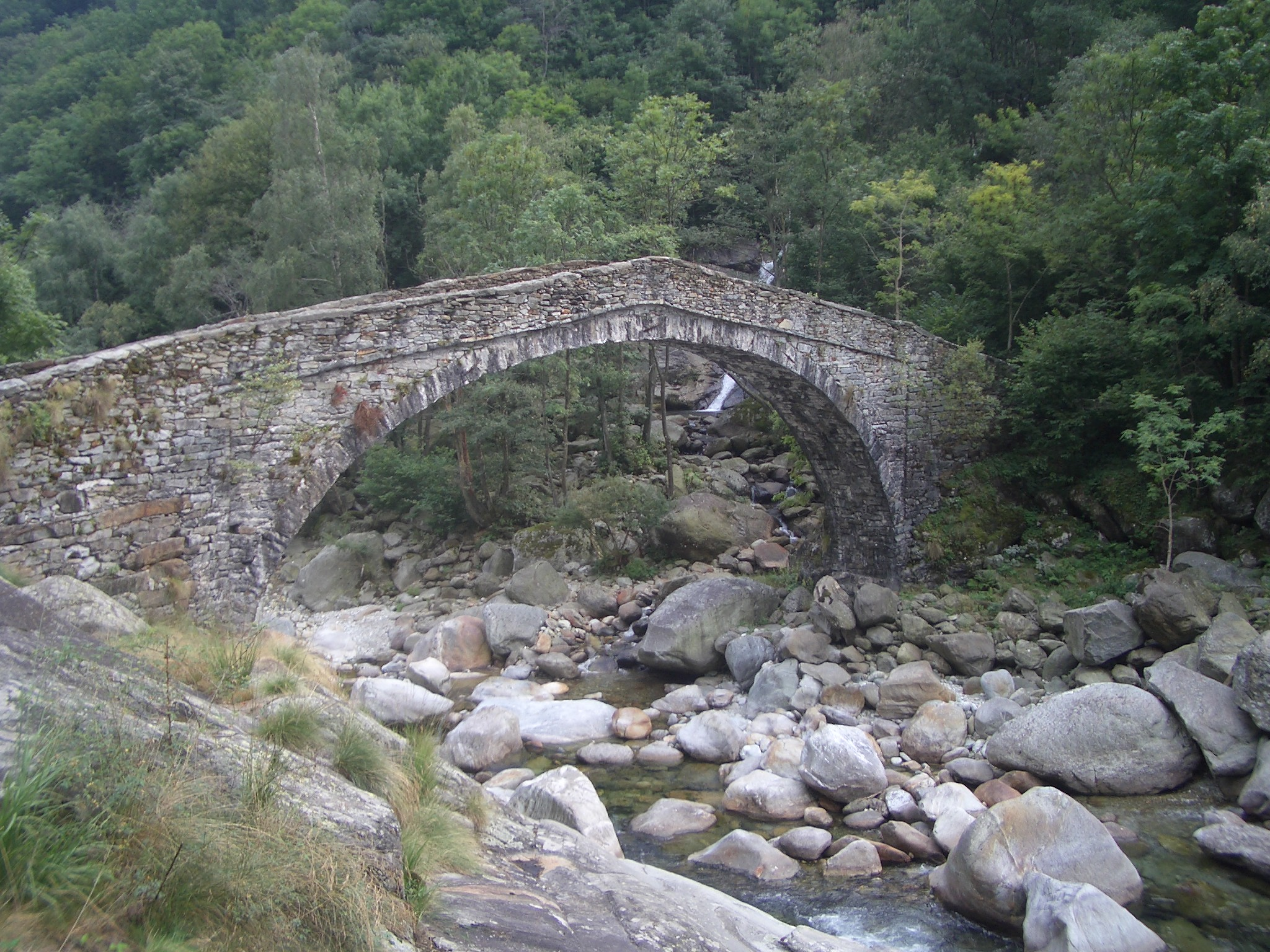
The bridge of the Chiara village (high Chiusella valley)

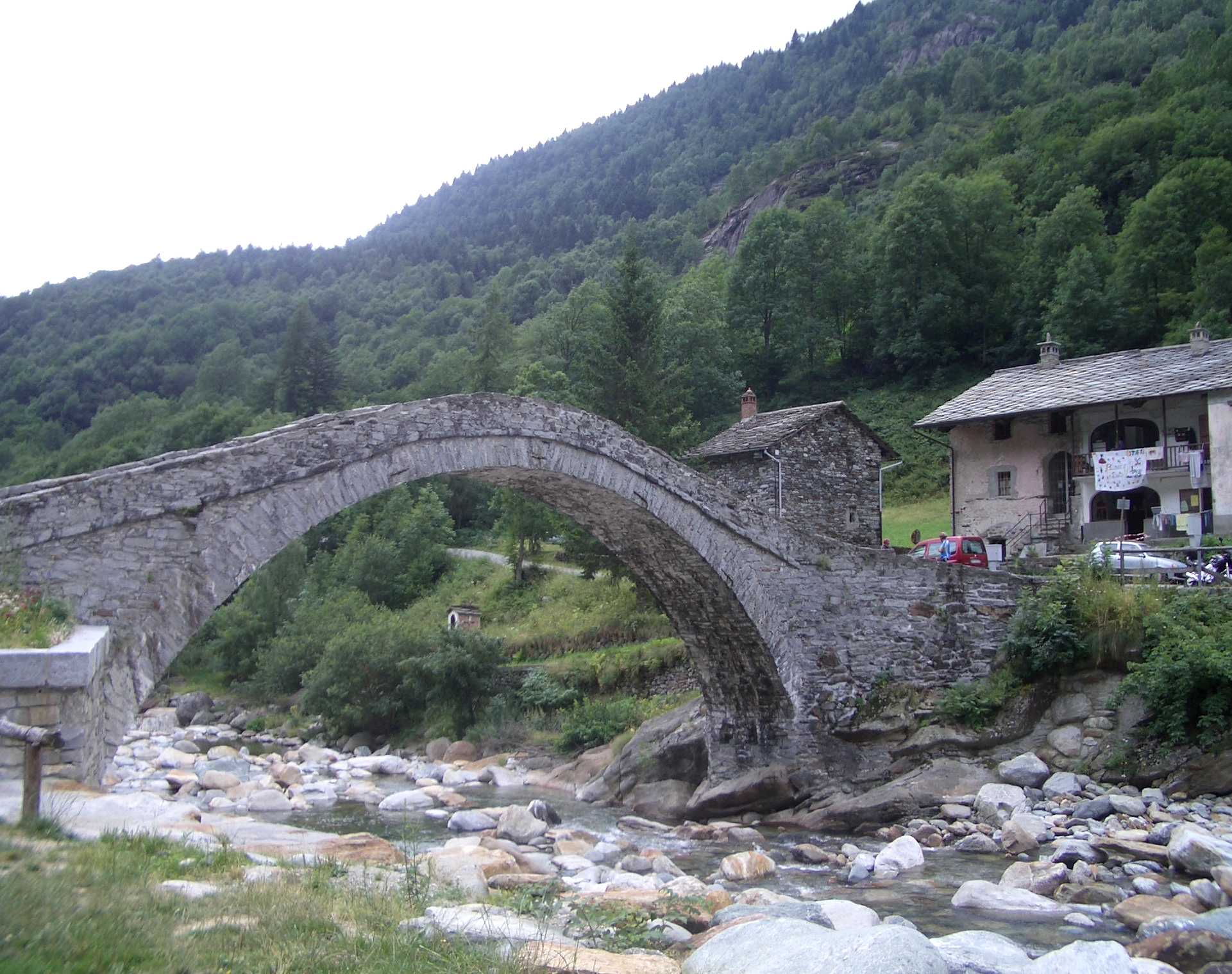
Fondo Valchiusella bridge

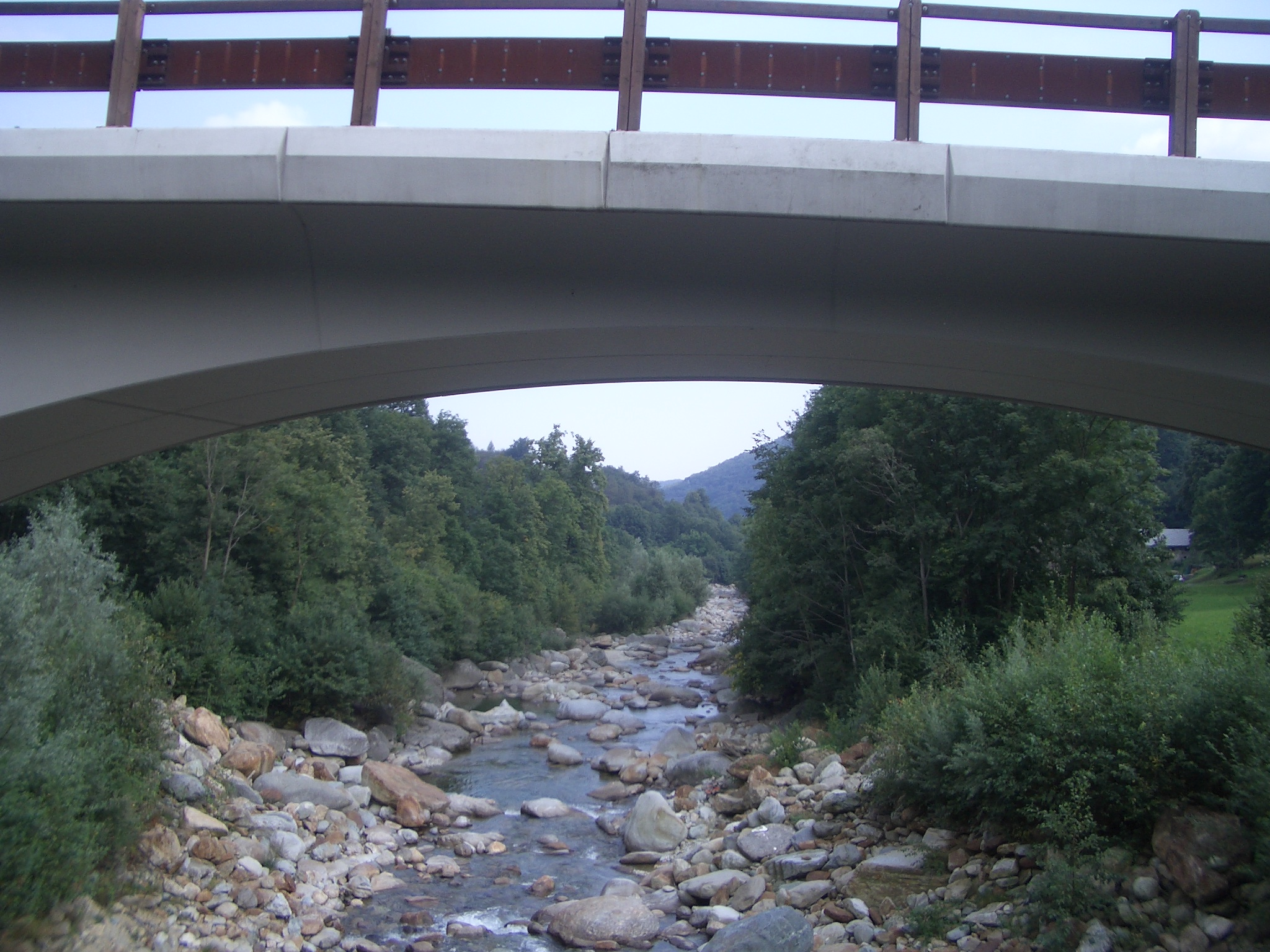
The Chiusella behind Inverso bridge

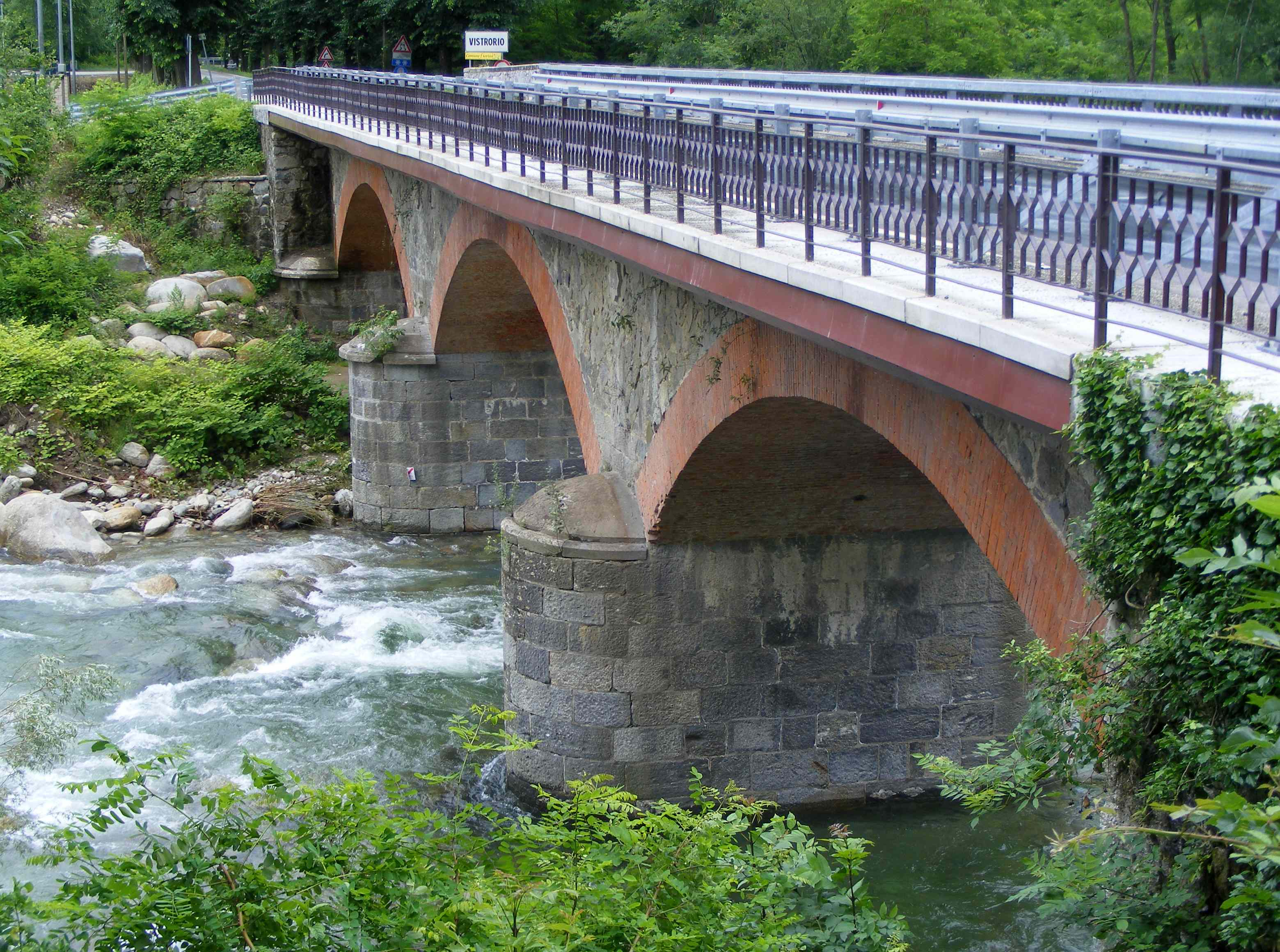
The bridge connecting Vistrorio and Issiglio

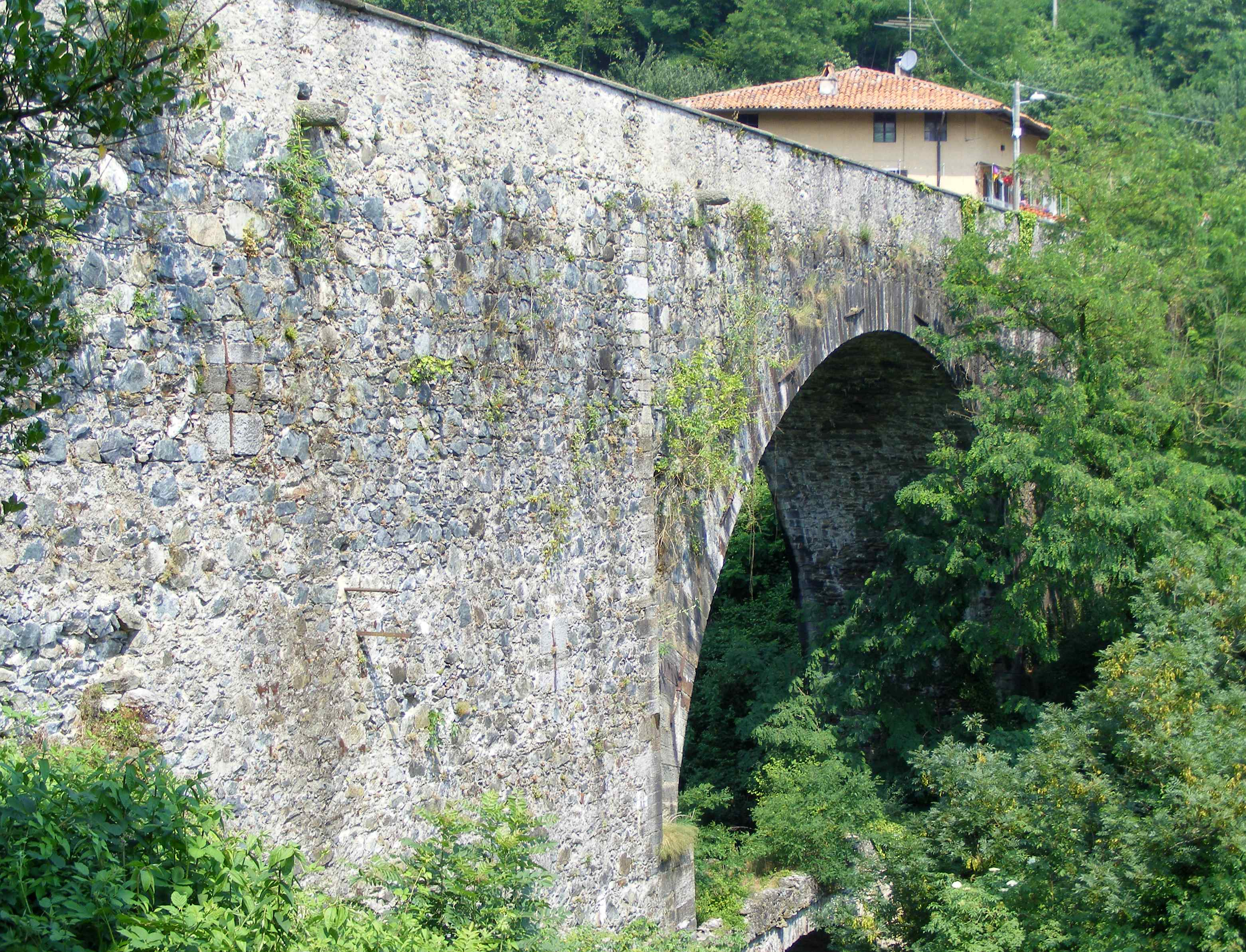
An 18th-century bridge named Ponte dei Preti (Strambinello)

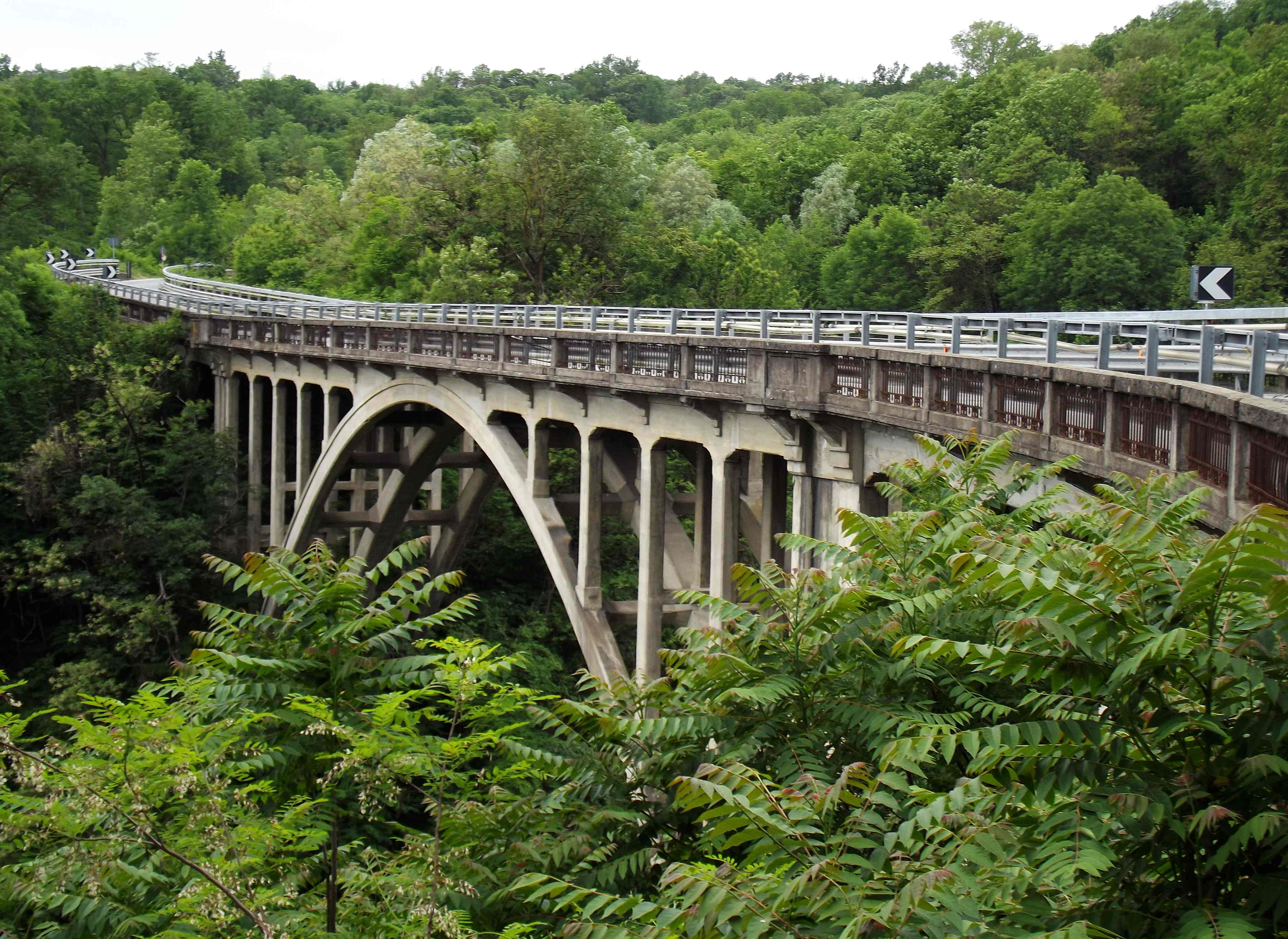
Former national road nr.565 between Strambinello and Baldissero Canavese

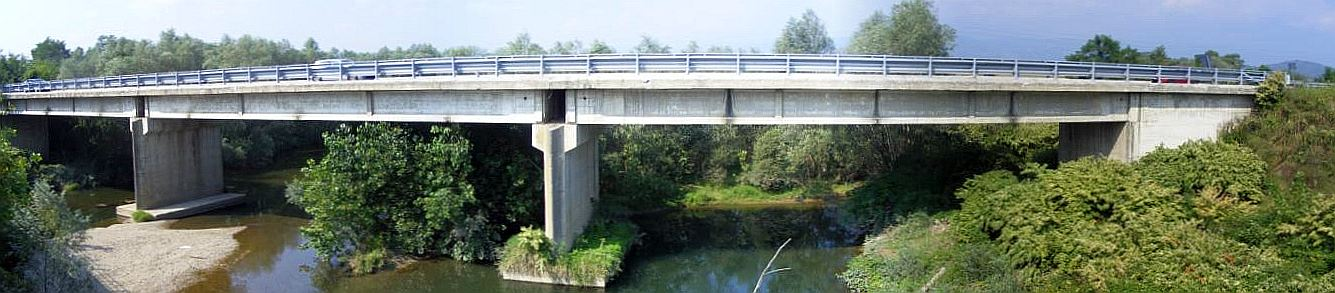
The bridge of the national road nr.26 near Romano Canavese

== Other projects ==
Media related to Chiusella at Wikimedia Commons
