= Savenca =

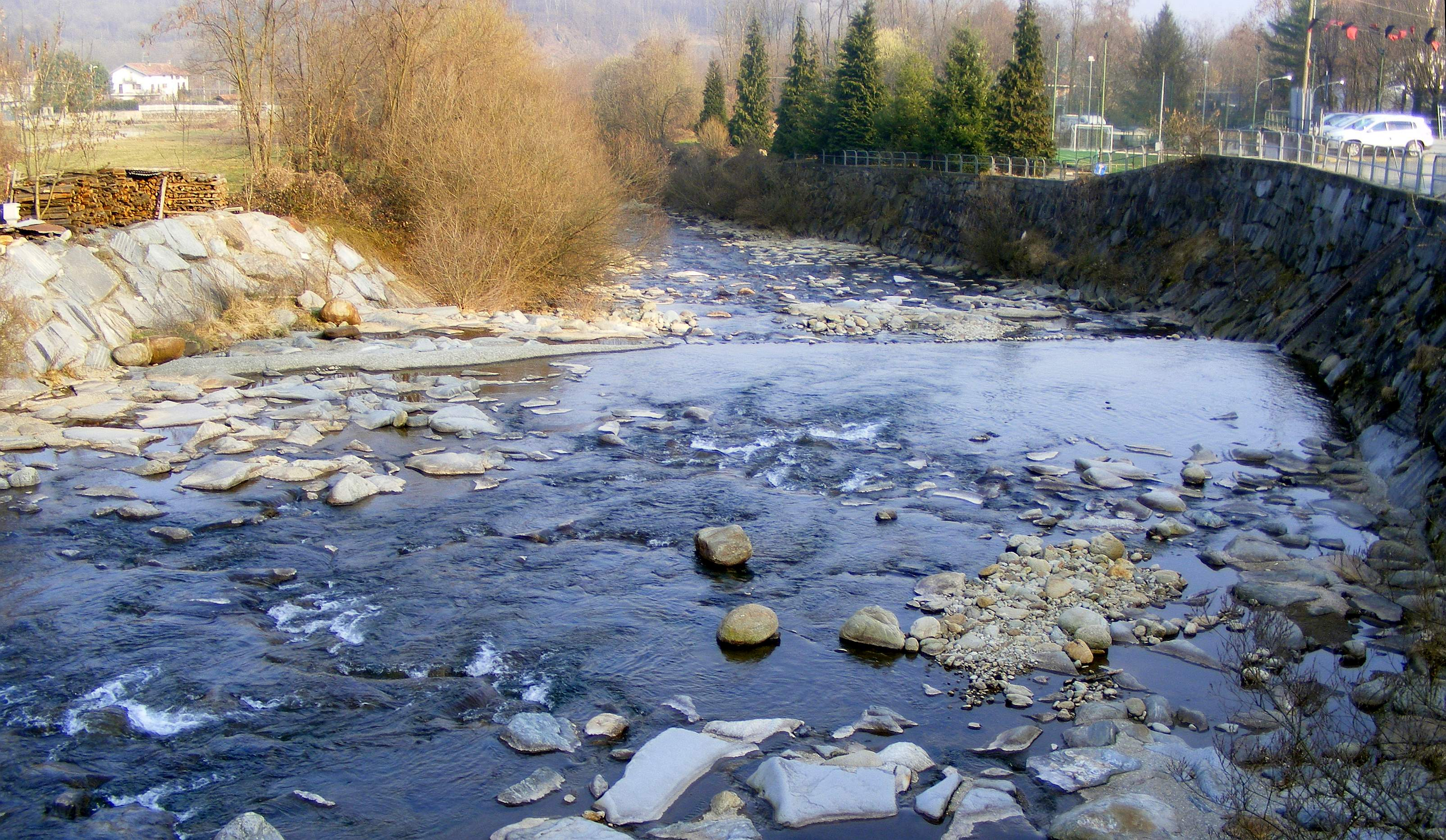

Location
- Country: Italy
- Region: Piedmont

Physical characteristics
- Source
  - location: Punta Bordevolo
- Mouth: Chiusella
  - location: Issiglio
  - coordinates: 45°26′47″N 7°45′33″E
- Length: 11.2 km (7.0 mi)
- Basin size: 33.5 km^{2} (12.9 sq mi)

The Savenca is a stream which flows through the Savenca Valley in Piedmont, Italy. It is a tributary of the Chiusella.

== Course ==
The streams originates in the municipality of Castelnuovo Nigra, in the basin enclosed by Cima di Pal (2,495 m, 8,186 ft), Costa Bordevolo (2,622 m, 8,602 ft), and Cima la Rubbia (2,426 m, 7,959 ft). Flowing fairly consistently from northwest to southeast throughout its course, it runs through the short alpine valley of the same name.

Shortly downstream from a small sanctuary dedicated to Saint Mary Magdalene, it skirts the municipal territory of Rueglio. It then passes northeast of the main settlement of Issiglio before flowing into the Chiusella at an elevation of 466 m.
