= Vistrorio =

- Comune
- Comune di Vistrorio
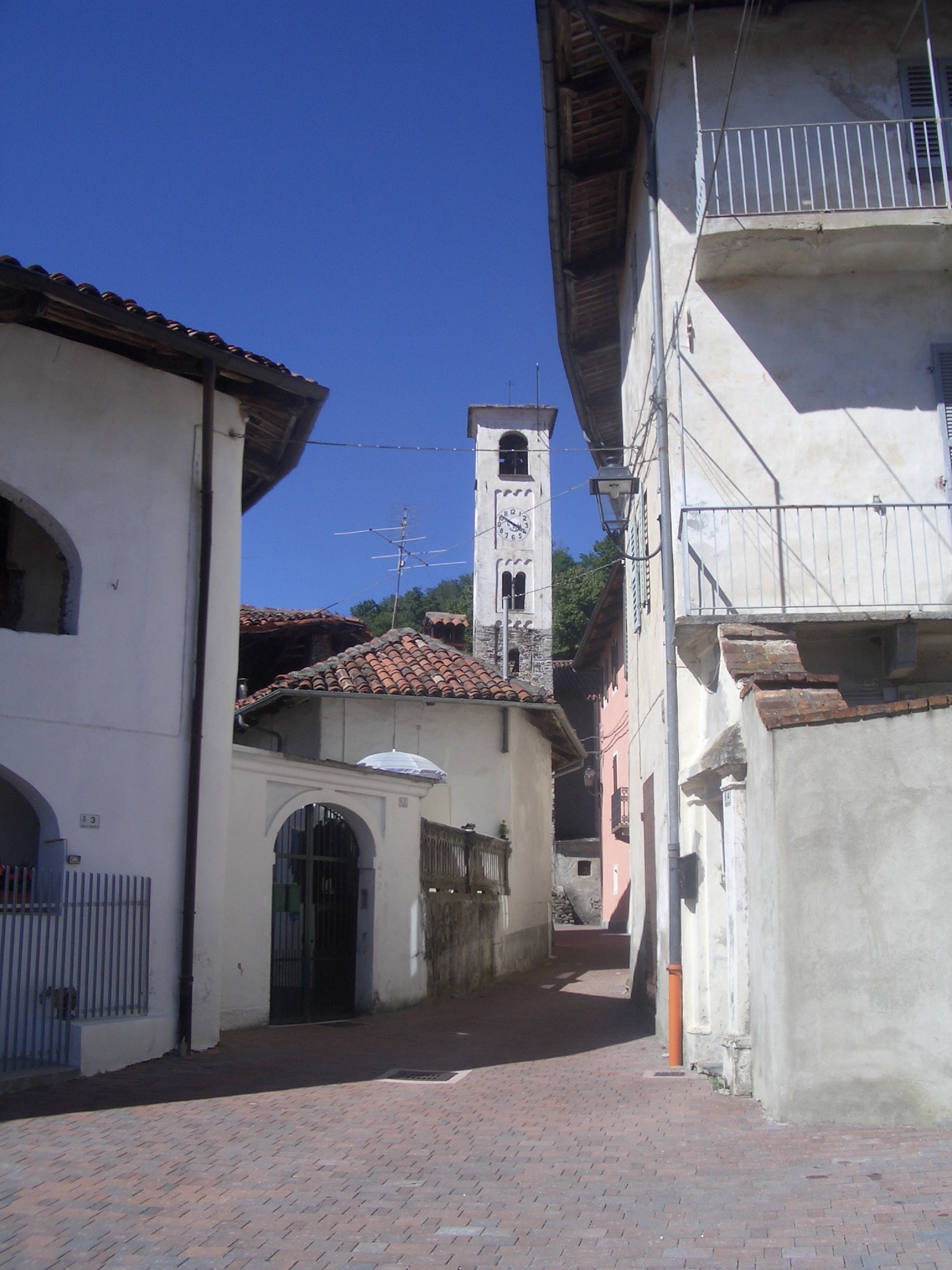
- View of the village, with the church of San Bartolomeo

- Location within Italy Location within Piedmont
- Coordinates: 45°26′N 7°46′E
- Country: Italy
- Region: Piedmont
- Metropolitan city: Turin (TO)

Government
  - Mayor: Domenico Ravetto Enri

Area
  - Total: 4.68 km^{2} (1.81 sq mi)
- Elevation: 480 m (1,570 ft)

Population (31 August 2021)
  - Total: 506
  - Density: 108/km^{2} (280/sq mi)
- Demonym: Vistoriesi
- Time zone: UTC+1 (CET)
  - Summer (DST): UTC+2 (CEST)
- Postal code: 10080
- Dialing code: 0125
- Website: Official website

Vistrorio is a comune (municipality) in the Metropolitan City of Turin in the Italian region Piedmont, located about 40 kilometres (25 mi) north of Turin.

Vistrorio borders the following municipalities: Rueglio, Issiglio, Castelnuovo Nigra, Vidracco, Quagliuzzo, Strambinello, Baldissero Canavese and Val di Chy.

== See also ==
- Lake Gurzia
