= Rueglio =

- Comune
- Comune di Rueglio
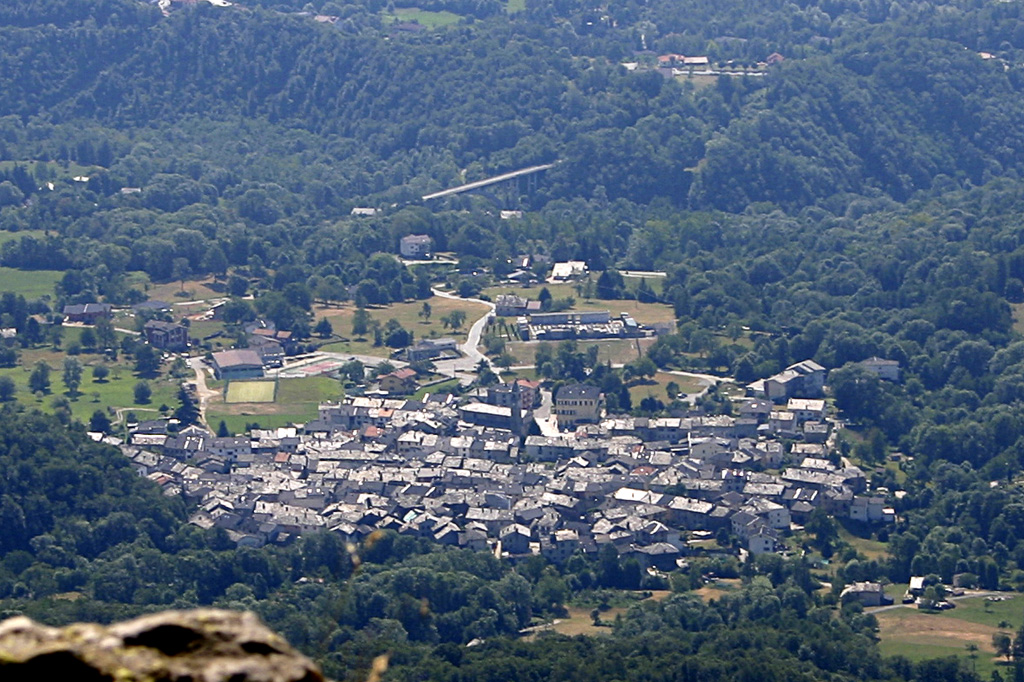

- Location within Italy Location within Piedmont
- Coordinates: 45°28′N 7°45′E
- Country: Italy
- Region: Piedmont
- Metropolitan city: Turin (TO)

Government
  - Mayor: Gabriella Maria Laffaille

Area
  - Total: 15.1 km^{2} (5.8 sq mi)
- Elevation: 675 m (2,215 ft)

Population (30 June 2018)
  - Total: 772
  - Density: 51.1/km^{2} (132/sq mi)
- Demonym: Ruegliesi
- Time zone: UTC+1 (CET)
  - Summer (DST): UTC+2 (CEST)
- Postal code: 10010
- Dialing code: 0125
- Website: Official website

Rueglio is a comune (municipality) in the Metropolitan City of Turin in the Italian region Piedmont, located about 45 kilometres (28 mi) north of Turin.

Rueglio borders the following municipalities: Castellamonte, Val di Chy, Valchiusa, Issiglio, Castelnuovo Nigra, and Vistrorio.
