= Lake Gurzia =

Artificial lake in Piedmont, Italy

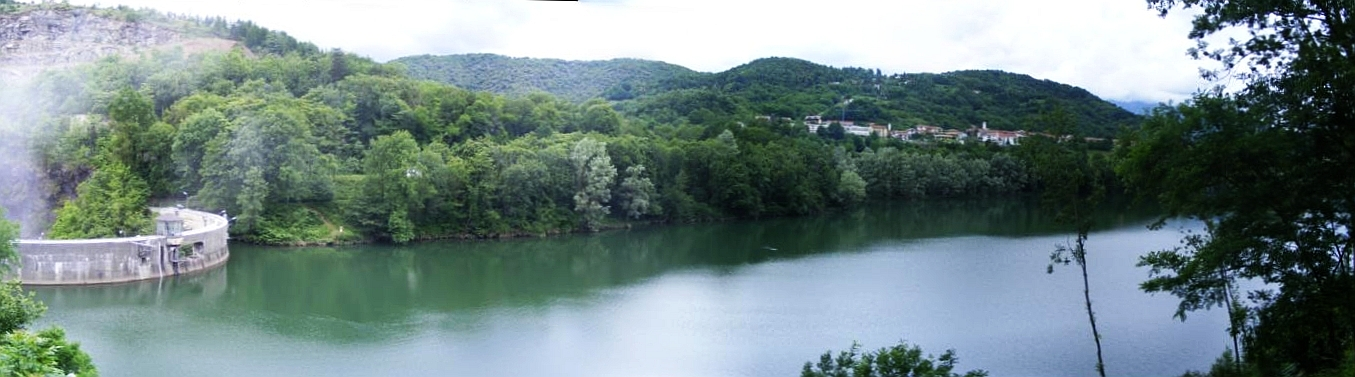
- The lake seen from the southeast
- Interactive map of Lake Gurzia
- Location: Vidracco, Vistrorio, Metropolitan City of Turin, Piedmont, Italy
- Coordinates: 45.42582°N 7.75801°E
- Type: Artificial dam
- Primary inflows: Chiusella
- Primary outflows: Chiusella
- Basin countries: Italy
- Max. length: 0.863 km (0.536 mi)
- Max. width: 0.262 km (0.163 mi)
- Surface area: 0.11 km^{2} (0.042 sq mi)
- Average depth: 49.5 m (162 ft)
- Water volume: 1,260 km^{3} (300 cu mi)
- Shore length^{1}: 2.1 km (1.3 mi)
- Surface elevation: 433 m (1,421 ft)
- ^{1} Shore length is not a well-defined measure.

The Lake Gurzia (sometimes also called Lake Vidracco or Lake Vistrorio) is an artificial lake basin created by the damming of the Chiusella stream just downstream of its confluence with its main tributary, the Savenca.

It is located at 432 m altitude between the municipalities of Vidracco and Vistrorio, both in the Metropolitan City of Turin.

== Morphology ==
The reservoir has a roughly rhomboidal shape with the longer diagonal oriented southwest/northeast. On the right bank, it is overlooked by the municipal center of Vidracco, which stretches parallel to the water body at around 470 m elevation; the opposite shore is flanked for almost its entire length by the SP 64 road of Valchiusella. The basin's shores are mostly wooded and quite steep, except in the uppermost area.

== Dam ==
The structure of the current dam dates back to 1922; it is a simple arch dam 50 meters high, leased to Enel Produzione for hydroelectric use. The impounded volume is 1.26 million cubic meters. The dam has foundations resting on a substrate formed by a Pleistocene moraine belonging to the Ivrea Morainic Amphitheatre.

An underground pipeline feeds the downstream hydroelectric plant of Ponte Preti, located in the municipality of Strambinello. The plant has two generating units with a power output of 6.2 MW and uses a water flow of 3.2 cubic metres per second (110 cu ft/s) with a drop of 132 metres (433 ft). The plant is one of the oldest in Italy, with construction beginning in 1888.

== Hiking ==
Just west of the lake are the Torre Cives hill (585 m) and the Monti Pelati, protected by the namesake nature reserve. The municipality of Vidracco maintains an ecomuseum of water and several trails and small equipped areas around the lake, enabling pedestrian connections with hiking routes within the reserve.

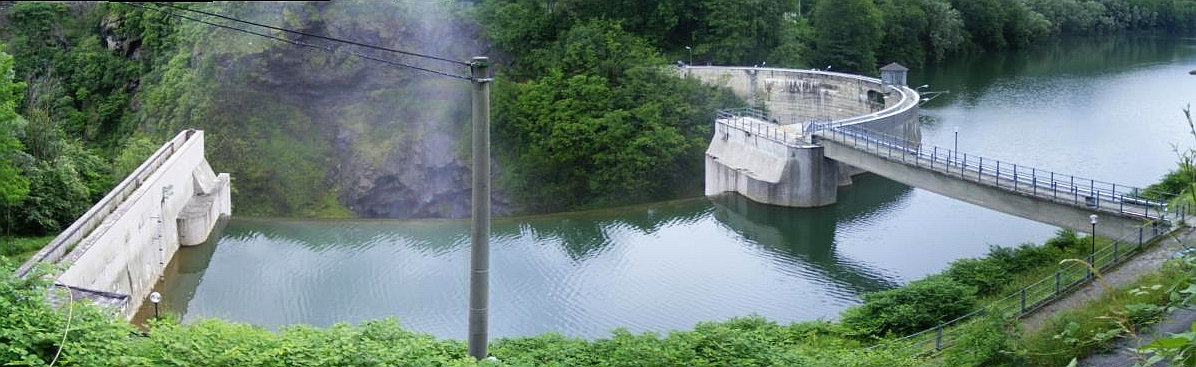
The spillway and crest of the dam seen from the southeast
