= Arrigo Candela =

Italian serial killer

- Born: 1956; Baldissero Canavese, Piedmont, Italy
- Died: 2007 (aged 50–51); Brittany, France
- Other name: "Rambo"
- Conviction: Murder
- Penalty: Life imprisonment

Details
- Victims: 7
- Span of crimes: 1990–1992
- Country: Italy, France
- States: Cuneo, Turin, Ille-et-Vilaine
- Date apprehended: 20 September 1992

Arrigo Candela (1956 – 2007), known as Rambo, was an Italian–French serial killer who murdered seven people in Italy and France during robberies that occurred between 1990 and 1992.

Tried and convicted for his sole murder in France, he was incarcerated there until his death in 2007.

== Early life ==
Born in Baldissero Canavese (Italy) in 1956, Candela was left in the care of his mother Conchita, a Frenchwoman and daughter of a partisan who had been killed at the Mauthausen concentration camp. His father, Riccardo Cecchetti, was a truck driver who later remarried to an Algerian woman in France and had two other sons, but never sought to contact Arrigo as he grew up.

The young boy began to show a strong interest in firearms and uniforms from an early age, with his favorite pastime being lurking in the woods and camouflage. This, along with his passion for warfare, earned him the nickname "The Rambo of the Piedmont".

As an adult, he avoided conscription by claiming that he had already served in France to Italian officials and claiming the reverse to their French counterparts. Candela was eventually charged with desertion in both countries, but was never properly prosecuted due to investigation proceedings being slowed down due to the confusion over which place had jurisdiction.

In the midst of this, Candela found work as a security guard and lived in his hometown with his wife. He soon realized that his true calling was robbery, and thus began stealing from local shopkeepers to make a living.

== Murders ==
In the early 1990s, Candela began a series of unprovoked murders of people he met at random. On 17 October 1990, Aldo Bruno and Felicina Brugiafreddo, two municipal employees who worked at the town hall in Cuneo, were shot to death while having lunch inside the man's camper, parked at a clearing in Crissolo. Bruno was the first to be killed with a shot to the heart, followed by Brugiafreddo, who tried to take refuge under a table. Almost a year later, on 18 September 1991, 21-year-old florist Emiliano Cecco was found lifeless inside his van in Barge after being shot five times through the driver's side window.

Barely a month later, he committed another double murder in the Province of Turin. The bodies of husband and wife Vincenzo Pilone (age 59) and Luigina Podio (age 49) were found. They had been shot to death while picking mushrooms in a forest in Mazzè. The initial theory by police was that the couple were killed by a poacher, who first shot Podio by accident and then killed Pilone to avoid having witnesses to the crime.

On the evening of 21 January 1992, Candela killed Carmine Gatta, the owner of a hardware store in Turin and his childhood friend, with whom he had a score to settle, apparently over a woman having an affair with Gatta. Candela waited under the victim's house, and as soon as Gatta left, he pulled out a Beretta 92 and fired sixteen shots, killing Gatta.

=== Flight and crimes in France ===
In the following months, unable to hide in the local woods, Candela crossed the border into Brittany, France his wife Antonietta "Tony" Biscotti. While there, he robbed four banks and made plans with his wife via wiretapped phone calls for the pair to escape somewhere like Kenya and Tanzania, where there was no extradition treaty to Italy.

On 17 September 1992, after robbing the Bank of Brittany in Redon, Candela escaped with 40,000 francs and got into a car parked at a nearby station. He was pursued, however, by municipal police officer Michel Macé, whom Candela shot five times near an elementary school.

After a three-day manhunt in which 3,000 police officers and helicopters were involved, Candela was arrested by French K9 units after surrendering without resistance. Numerous weapons were found in his home, including the Beretta used in the murder of Carmine Gatta; the 12-gauge pump-action shotgun used to kill Aldo Bruno and Felicina Brugiafreddo, an Uzi, and a .357 Magnum revolver.

== Trial, imprisonment and death ==
Two weeks after his arrest, Candela confessed responsibility for the seven murders to French authorities, but as this was considered "unofficial", the French judiciary decided to prosecute him solely for the crimes he committed in their country. For the next three years, Candela was in solitary confinement, where he would await trial for the murder of Officer Macé. During that time, he expressed his intent to write a book about his "exploits" in northern Italy, in which he also included quotes from famous philosophers, most notably Friedrich Nietzsche.

In 1996, Candela was tried in Rennes and sentenced to life imprisonment for the murder of Michel Macé, with an additional 18-year security period and solitary confinement for the numerous robberies he committed in France and an attempted murder against another police officer surnamed Dudziak.

Despite repeated requests to be extradited back to Italy, the French authorities refused to do so on the grounds that he was a dual French citizen and had to remain there to serve out his sentence for the crimes committed on French soil. As a result, Candela remained incarcerated in a French prison until his death in 2007.

== See also ==
- List of serial killers by country
