= Baldissero Canavese Castle =

- Castello di Baldissero Canavese
- Baldissero Canavese, Piedmont, Italy
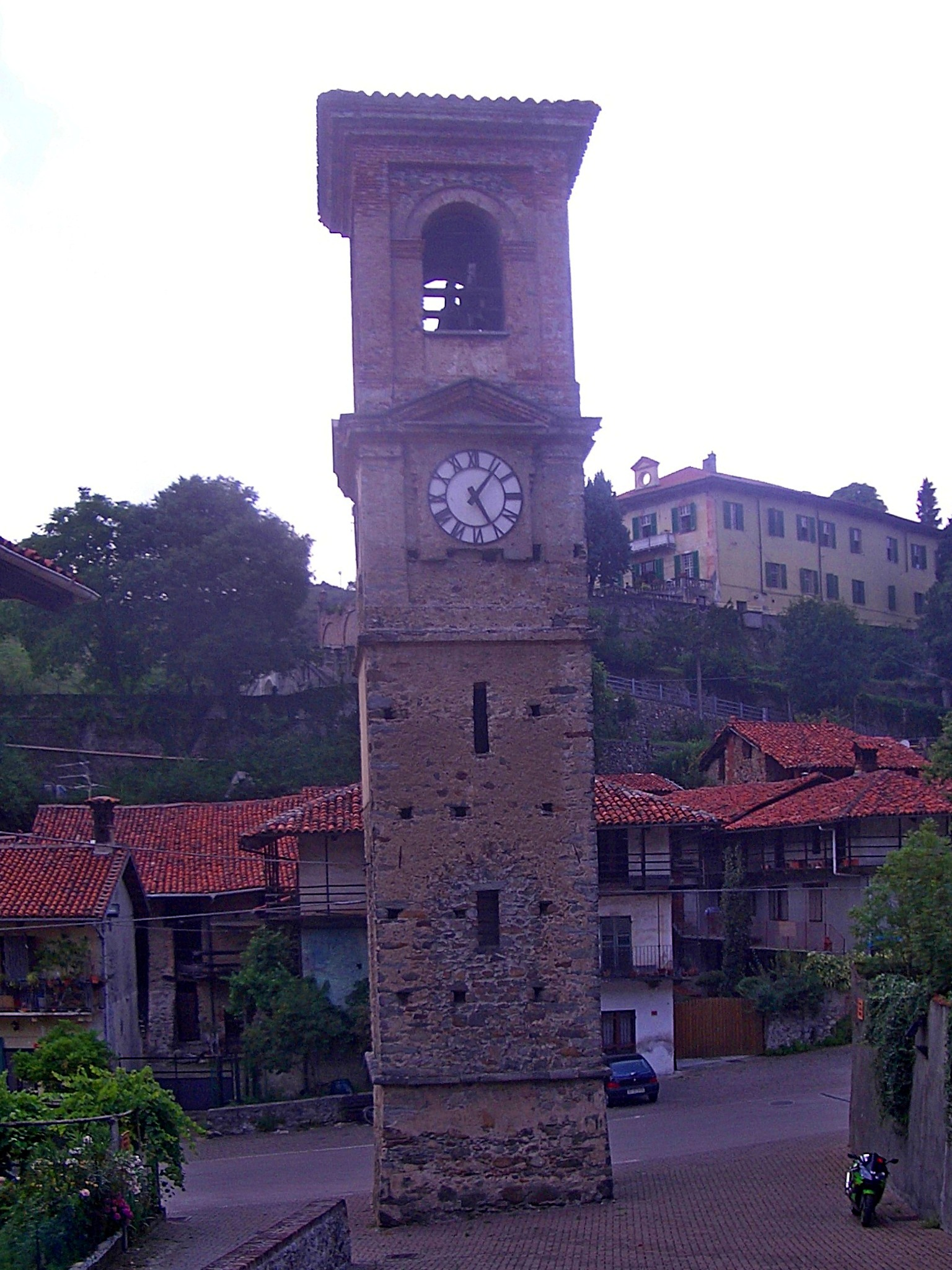
- Civic tower with Baldissero Canavese Castle in the background

Site information
- Type: Castle

Location
- Location in Italy
- Location within Italy
- Coordinates: 45°24′41.73″N 7°44′37.92″E

Baldissero Canavese Castle (Italian: Castello di Baldissero Canavese) is a castle located in Baldissero Canavese, Piedmont, Italy.

== History ==
The castle, perhaps built by adapting a previous fortification, is mentioned for the first time in public documents from 1190. At that time, it was owned by Oberto di Castel Romano, but in 1253 it passed to the Counts of San Martino, who retained ownership until the end of the 17th century. Towards the end of the 14th century, during the Tuchini revolt, the castle suffered severe damage and was subsequently rebuilt and expanded. With the extinction of the main line of the San Martino family, the castle passed through marriage to the Ripa di Gaglione and Meana families. From the Ripa di Meana, the castle later passed to Count Giuseppe Adami di Bergolo, who sold it to the French Count Doré. It then passed to Stefano Brossa, who, in turn, sold it in 1858 to Cavaliere Felice Oddone di Feletto. During the 18th century, the Ripa di Meana family and the Oddone di Feletto family transformed the castle, emphasising its residential features. In 1888, naval engineer and admiral Giacinto Pullino, known for designing the first submarine of the Italian Navy, the Delfino, purchased and further enlarged the castle.
