= Pecco =

- Frazione
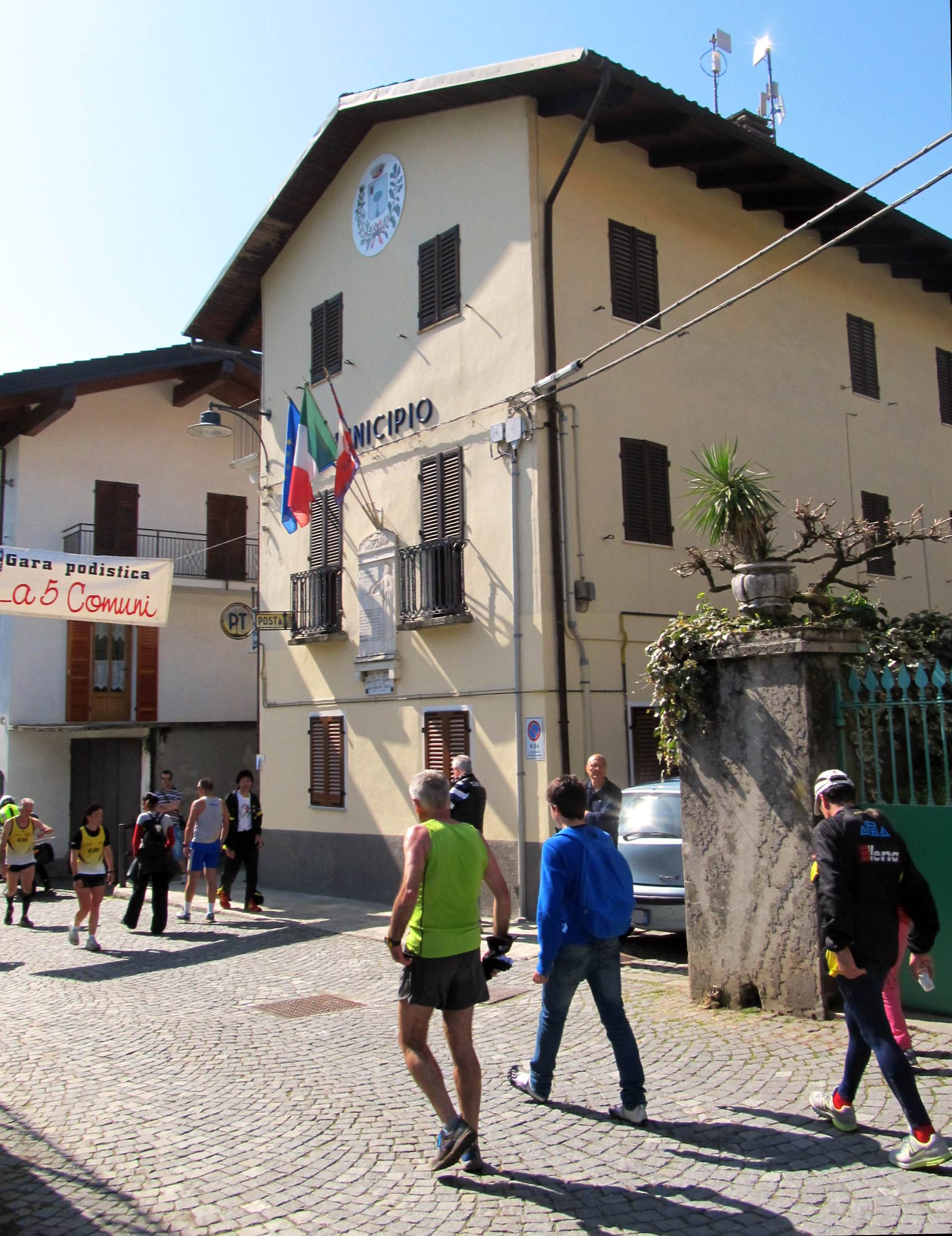

- Location of Pecco in Italy
- Coordinates: 45°27′N 7°47′E
- Country: Italy
- Region: Piedmont
- Metropolitan city: Turin (TO)
- Comune: Val di Chy

Population
  - Total: 222
- Time zone: UTC+1 (CET)
  - Summer (DST): UTC+2 (CEST)
- Postal code: 10080
- Dialing code: 0125

Pecco is a frazione (hamlet) of the comune (municipality) of Val di Chy in the Metropolitan City of Turin in the Italian region Piedmont, located about 45 kilometres (28 mi) north of Turin. It was a separate comune until January 2019.
