= Vidracco =

- Comune
- Comune di Vidracco
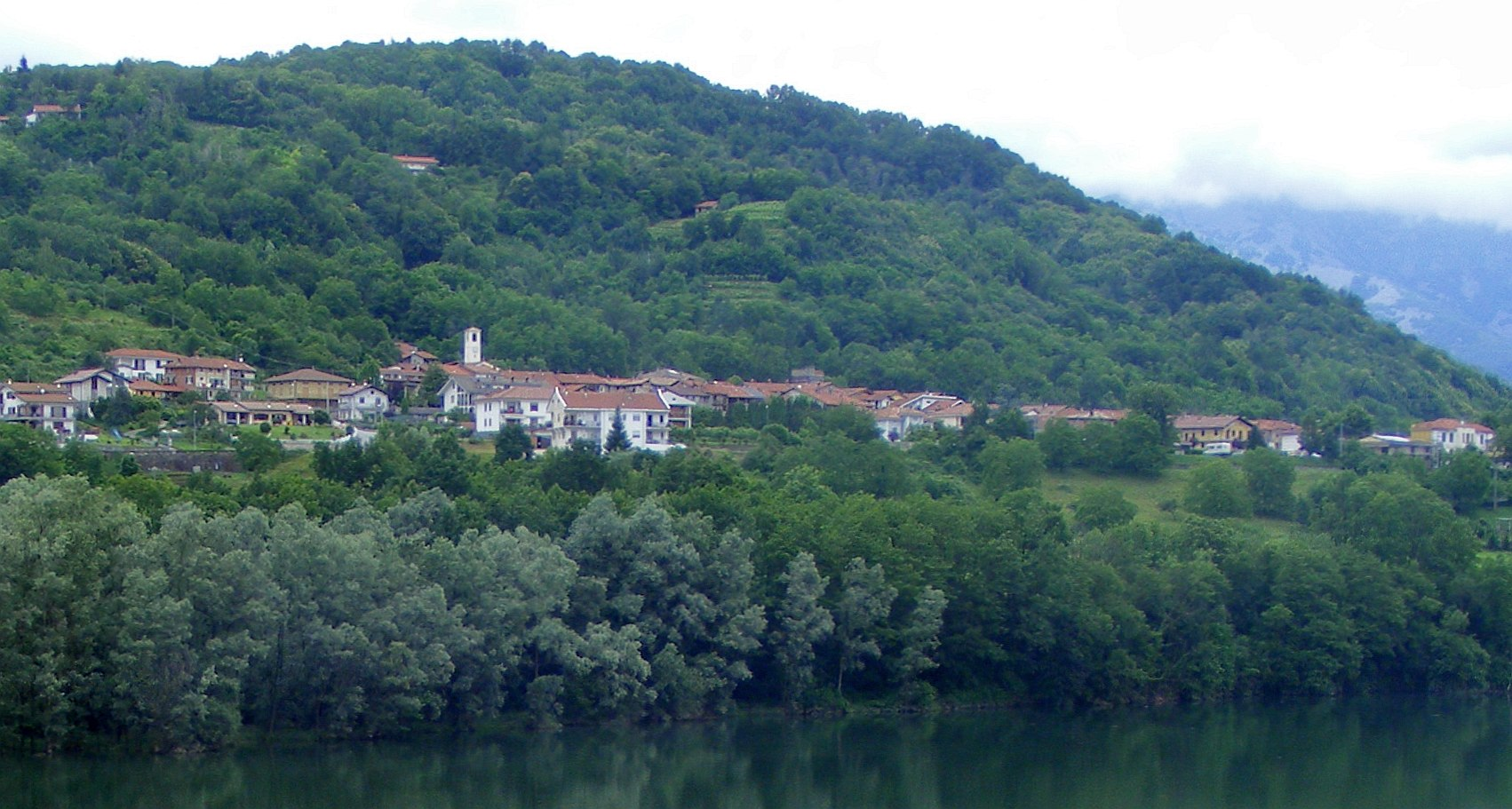

- Location within Italy Location within Piedmont
- Coordinates: 45°26′N 7°45′E
- Country: Italy
- Region: Piedmont
- Metropolitan city: Turin (TO)

Area
  - Total: 3.2 km^{2} (1.2 sq mi)

Population (Dec. 2004)
  - Total: 541
  - Density: 170/km^{2} (440/sq mi)
- Time zone: UTC+1 (CET)
  - Summer (DST): UTC+2 (CEST)
- Postal code: 10080
- Dialing code: 0125

Vidracco is a comune (municipality) in the Metropolitan City of Turin in the Italian region of Piedmont, located about 40 kilometres (25 mi) north of Turin. As of 31 December 2004, it had a population of 541 and an area of 3.2 square kilometres (1.2 mi^{2}).

Vidracco borders the following municipalities: Castellamonte, Issiglio, Vistrorio, and Baldissero Canavese.

== Demographic evolution ==
Historical population

Year	Pop.	±%
1861	469	—
1871	525	+11.9%
1881	554	+5.5%
1901	487	−12.1%
1911	544	+11.7%

Year	Pop.	±%
1921	517	−5.0%
1931	432	−16.4%
1936	386	−10.6%
1951	326	−15.5%
1961	344	+5.5%

Year	Pop.	±%
1971	353	+2.6%
1981	346	−2.0%
1991	417	+20.5%
2001	522	+25.2%

Source: Data from ISTAT

== See also ==
- Federation of Damanhur
- Lake Gurzia
