= Lugnacco =

- Frazione
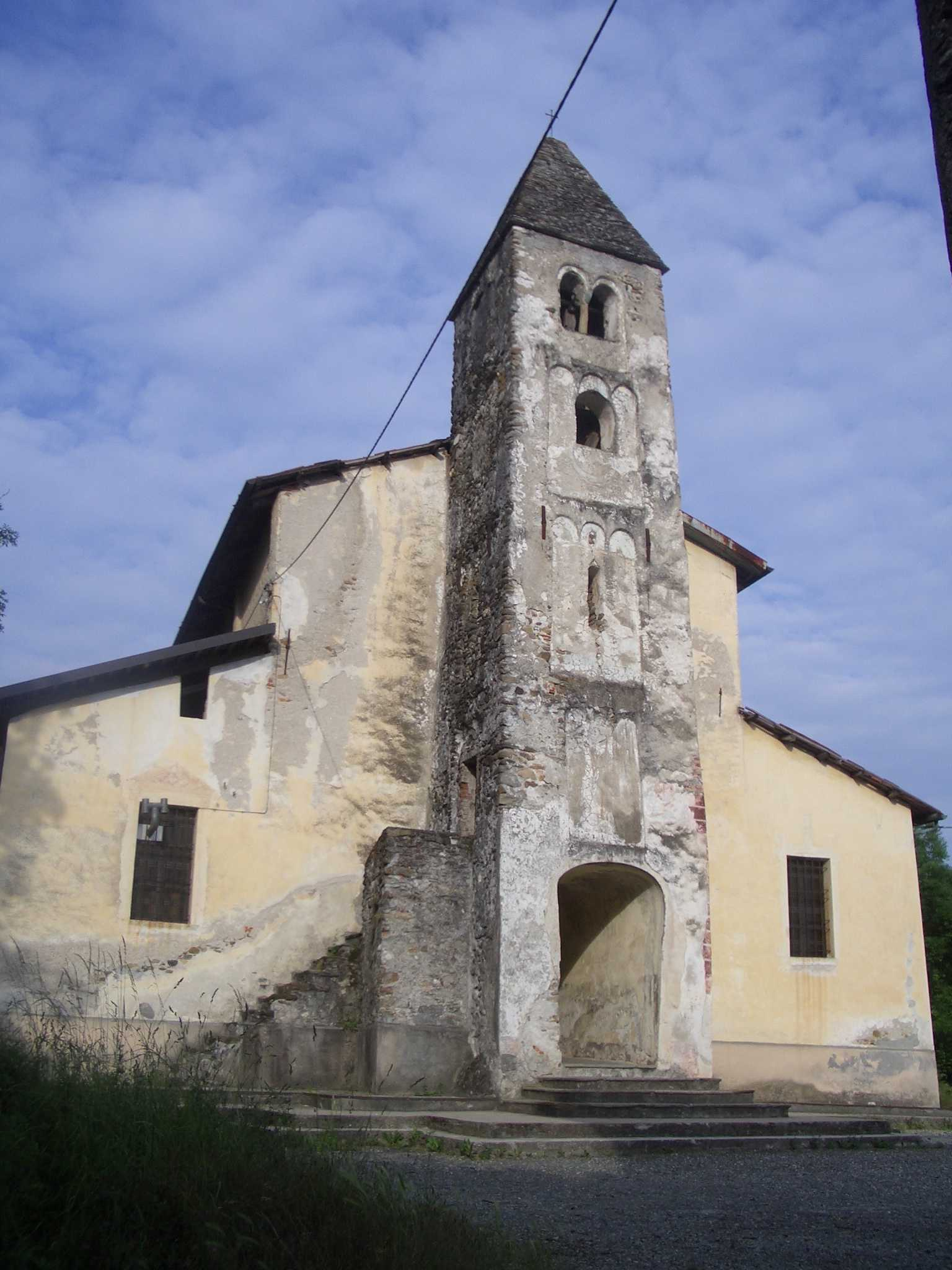

- Location of Lugnacco in Italy
- Country: Italy
- Region: Piedmont
- Metropolitan city: Turin (TO)
- Comune: Val di Chy
- Time zone: UTC+1 (CET)
  - Summer (DST): UTC+2 (CEST)

Lugnacco is a frazione (hamlet) of the comune (municipality) of Val di Chy in the Metropolitan City of Turin in the Italian region Piedmont, located about 45 kilometres (28 mi) north of Turin. It was a separate comune until January 2019.
