= Strambinello Castle =

Castle in Piedmont, Italy

- Castello di Strambinello
- Strambinello, Piedmont, Italy
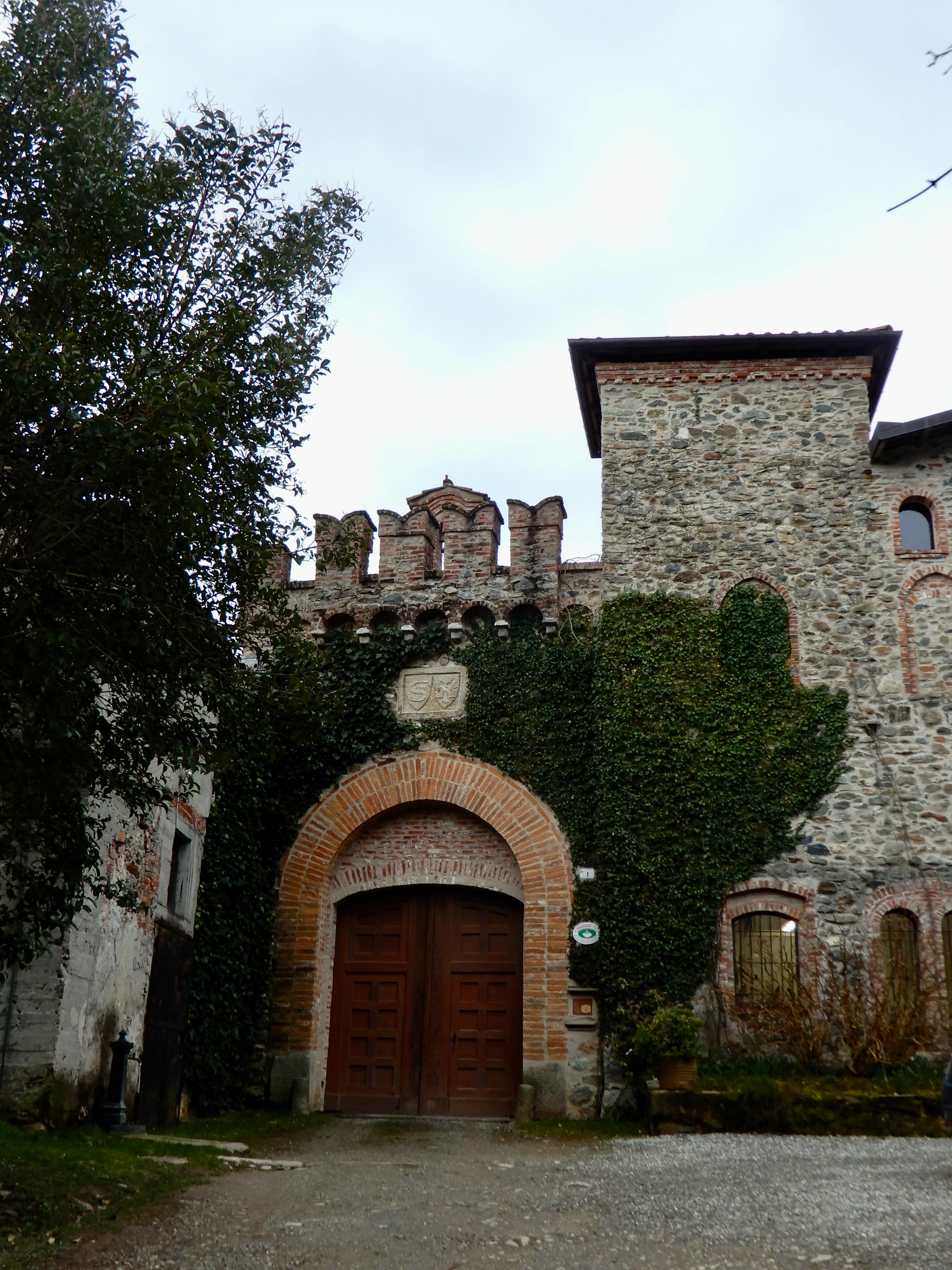
- Strambinello Castle in 2025

Site information
- Type: Castle

Location
- Location in Italy
- Coordinates: 45°25′11.01″N 7°46′21.77″E

Strambinello Castle (Italian: Castello di Strambinello) is a castle located in Strambinello, Piedmont, Italy.

== History ==
The castle, built in a strategic position as an outpost in relation to other castles of the Pedanea, is documented from the 12th century. Originally a quadrangular medieval fortress with corner towers, it passed from the Counts of San Martino to the Counts of Castellamonte in 1310. In 1387, during the Tuchini revolt, it was besieged and destroyed, along with other castles in the area. Rebuilt in the following centuries, it still retains clear traces of its medieval structure.

In the 17th century, the castle underwent extensive transformations in line with the tastes of the time. The main halls were adorned with large fireplaces topped with noble coats of arms, and a room was dedicated on the main floor to Charles Emmanuel II, Duke of Savoy. At the end of the 17th century, the castle passed through marriage from the Counts of Castellamonte to the Counts of Bersano, and in the 18th century, it came into the possession of the Counts of Barone.

In the 19th century, the castle was divided among various bourgeois families, who used it as a farmhouse, storage, cellars, and stables, leading to its gradual deterioration. Since the 1980s, the castle, then in ruins, has been restored and converted into a hotel.
