= Issiglio =

- Comune
- Comune di Issiglio
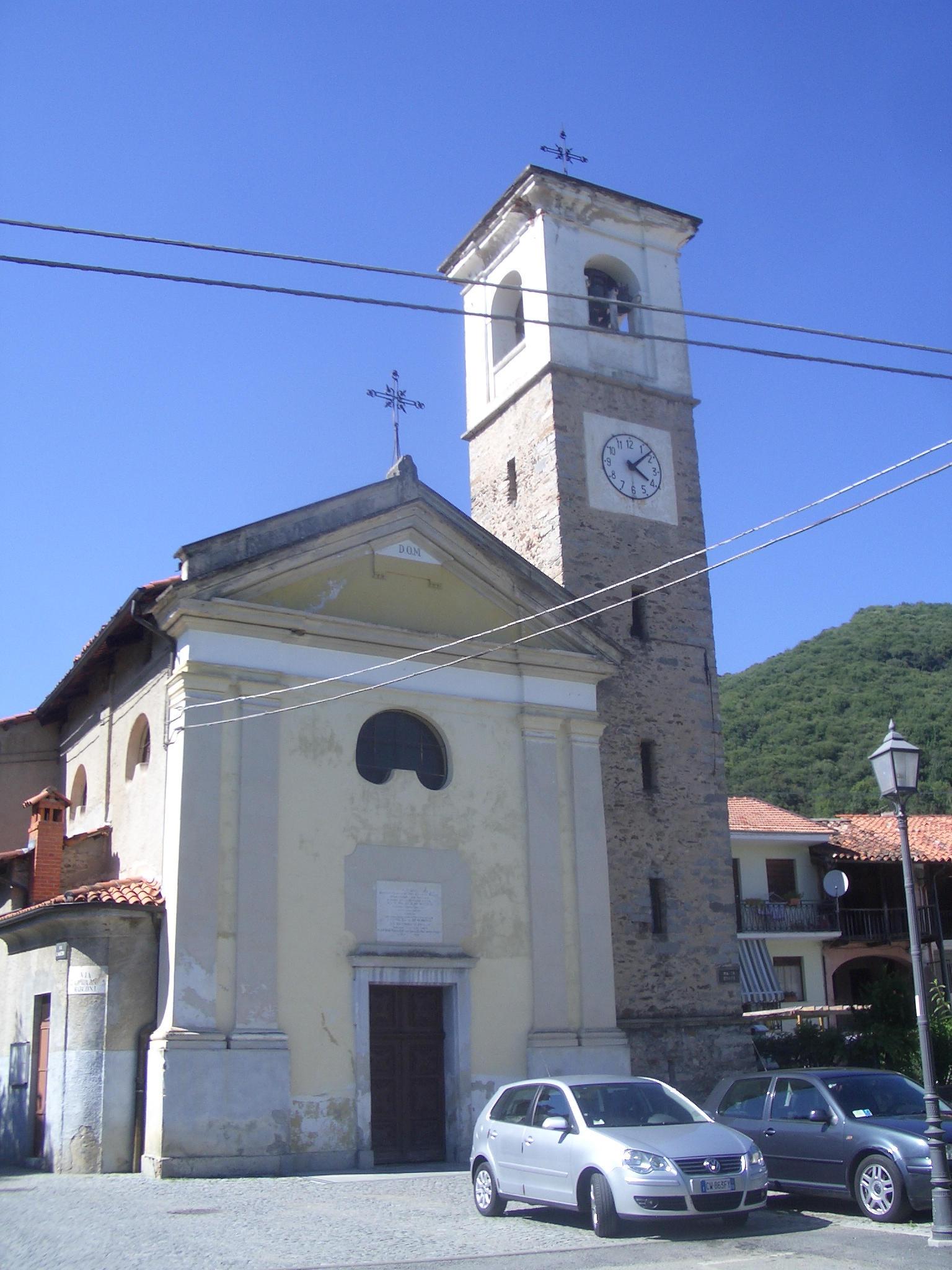
- Parish church.

- Location within Italy Location within Piedmont
- Coordinates: 45°27′N 7°45′E
- Country: Italy
- Region: Piedmont
- Metropolitan city: Turin (TO)

Government
  - Mayor: Sergio Pier Antonio Vigna

Area
  - Total: 5.5 km^{2} (2.1 sq mi)
- Elevation: 485 m (1,591 ft)

Population (31 August 2021)
  - Total: 405
  - Density: 74/km^{2} (190/sq mi)
- Demonym: Issigliesi
- Time zone: UTC+1 (CET)
  - Summer (DST): UTC+2 (CEST)
- Postal code: 10080
- Dialing code: 0125
- Website: Official website

Issiglio is a comune (municipality) in the Metropolitan City of Turin in the Italian region Piedmont, located about 45 kilometres (28 mi) north of Turin.

Issiglio borders the following municipalities: Castellamonte, Val di Chy, Rueglio, Vistrorio, and Vidracco.
