= Baldissero Canavese =

- Comune
- Comune di Baldissero Canavese
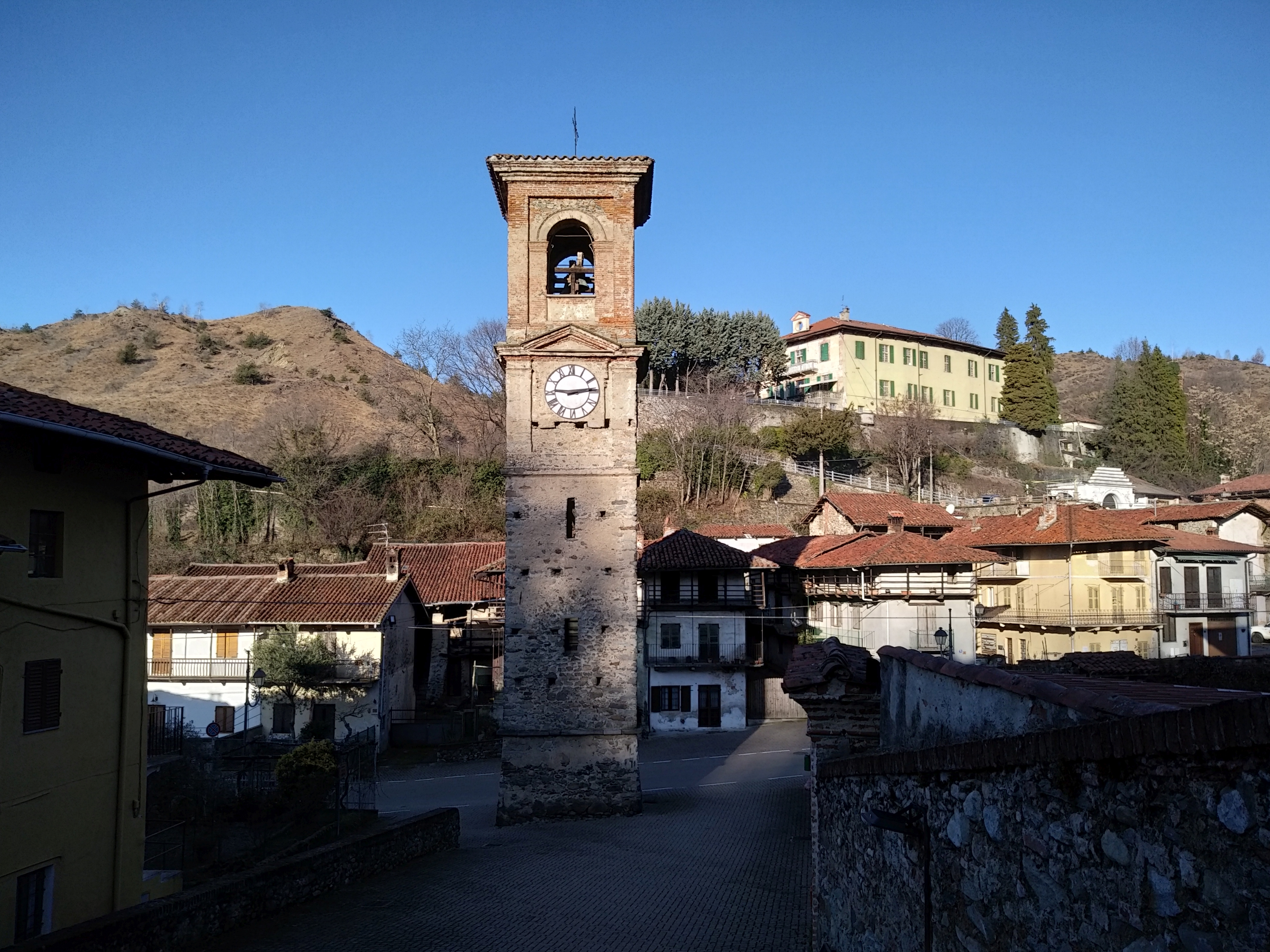
- Parish church.

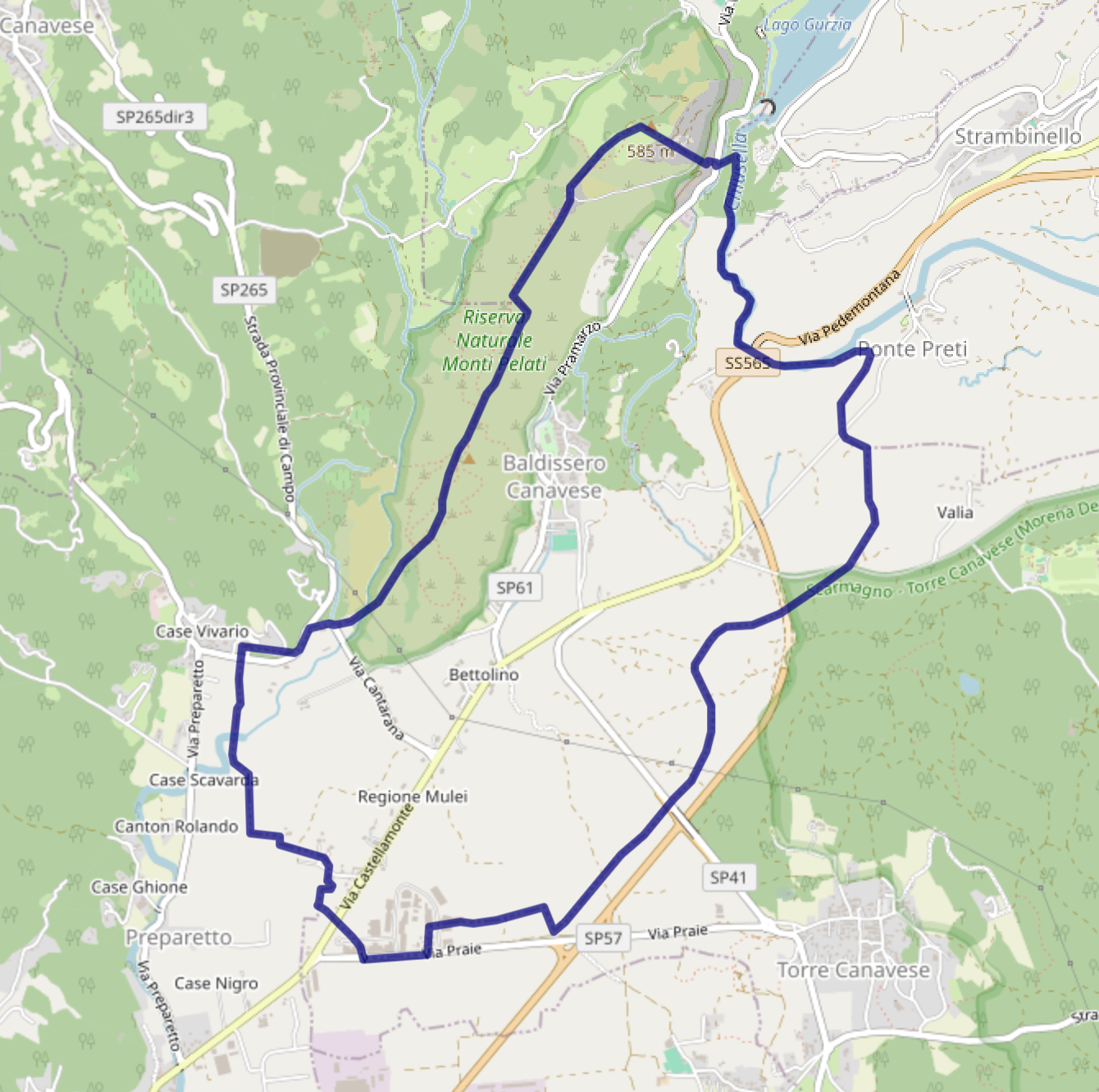
- OSM map of Baldissero Canavese.

- Location within Italy Location within Piedmont
- Coordinates: 45°25′N 7°45′E
- Country: Italy
- Region: Piedmont
- Metropolitan city: Turin (TO)

Government
  - Mayor: Luigi Ferrero Vercelli

Area
  - Total: 4.51 km^{2} (1.74 sq mi)
- Elevation: 392 m (1,286 ft)

Population (1-1-2017)
  - Total: 546
  - Density: 121/km^{2} (314/sq mi)
- Demonym: Baldisserese(i)
- Time zone: UTC+1 (CET)
  - Summer (DST): UTC+2 (CEST)
- Postal code: 10080
- Dialing code: 0124

Baldissero Canavese is a comune (municipality) in the Metropolitan City of Turin in the Italian region Piedmont, about 40 kilometres (25 mi) north of Turin.

Baldissero Canavese borders the following municipalities: Castellamonte, Vistrorio, Vidracco, Strambinello, and Torre Canavese.

Main sights include Baldissero Canavese Castle.

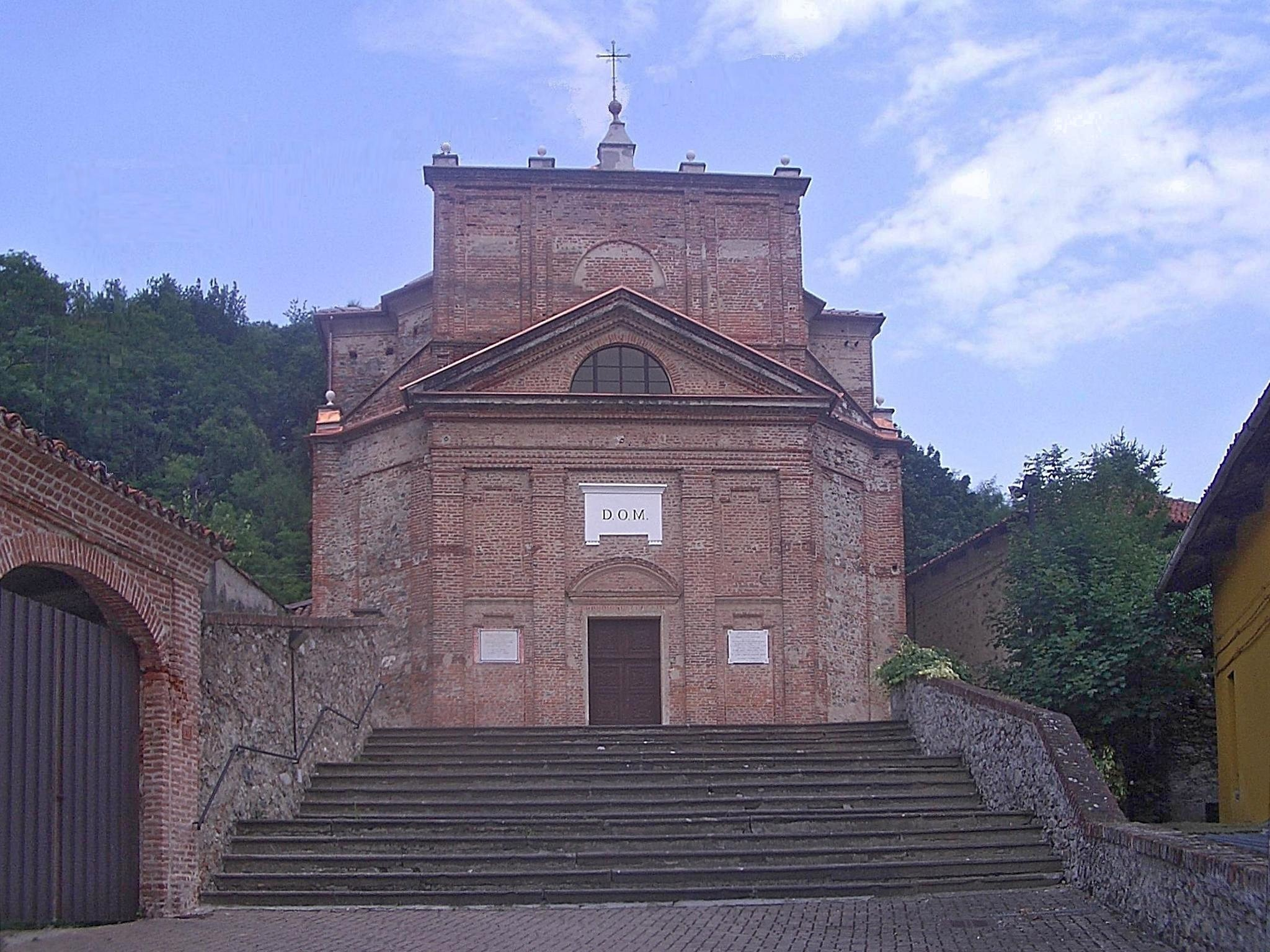
