= Castelnuovo Nigra =

- Comune
- Comune di Castelnuovo Nigra
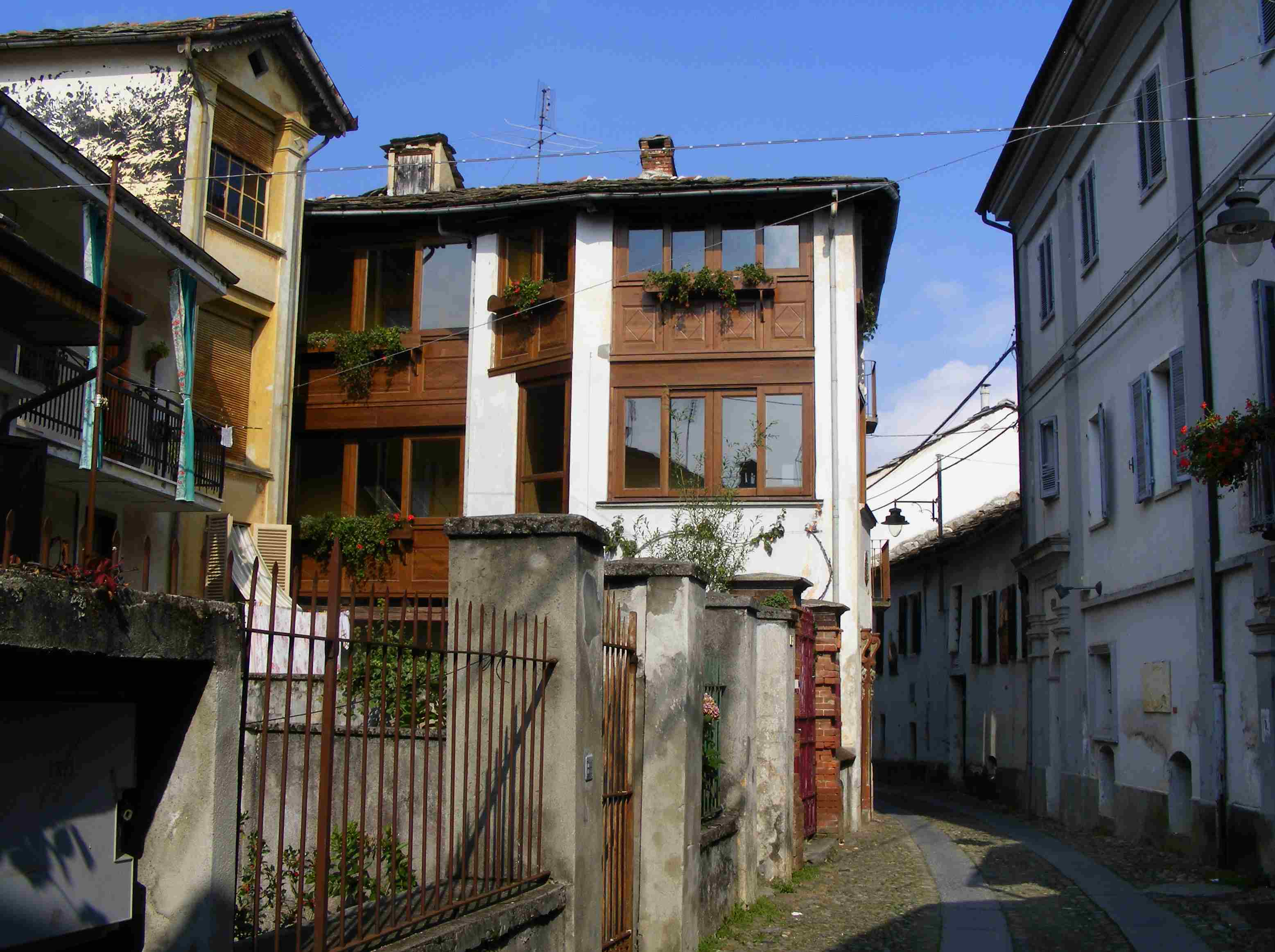

- Coat of arms

- Location within Italy Location within Piedmont
- Coordinates: 45°26′N 7°42′E
- Country: Italy
- Region: Piedmont
- Metropolitan city: Turin (TO)

Government
  - Mayor: Danilo Giovanni Chiuminatti

Area
  - Total: 28.38 km^{2} (10.96 sq mi)
- Elevation: 828 m (2,717 ft)

Population (1-1-2017)
  - Total: 434
  - Density: 15.3/km^{2} (39.6/sq mi)
- Demonym: Salese(i) (Sale Castelnuovo) - Villese(i) (Villa Castelnuovo)
- Time zone: UTC+1 (CET)
  - Summer (DST): UTC+2 (CEST)
- Postal code: 10080
- Dialing code: 0124
- Patron saint: St. Sebastian
- Saint day: 20 January
- Website: Official website

Castelnuovo Nigra is a comune (municipality) in the Metropolitan City of Turin in the Italian region Piedmont, located about 40 kilometres (25 mi) north of Turin. It is formed by the union of two villages: Sale Castelnuovo and Villa Castelnuovo.
