= Val di Chy =

- Comune
- Comune di Val di Chy
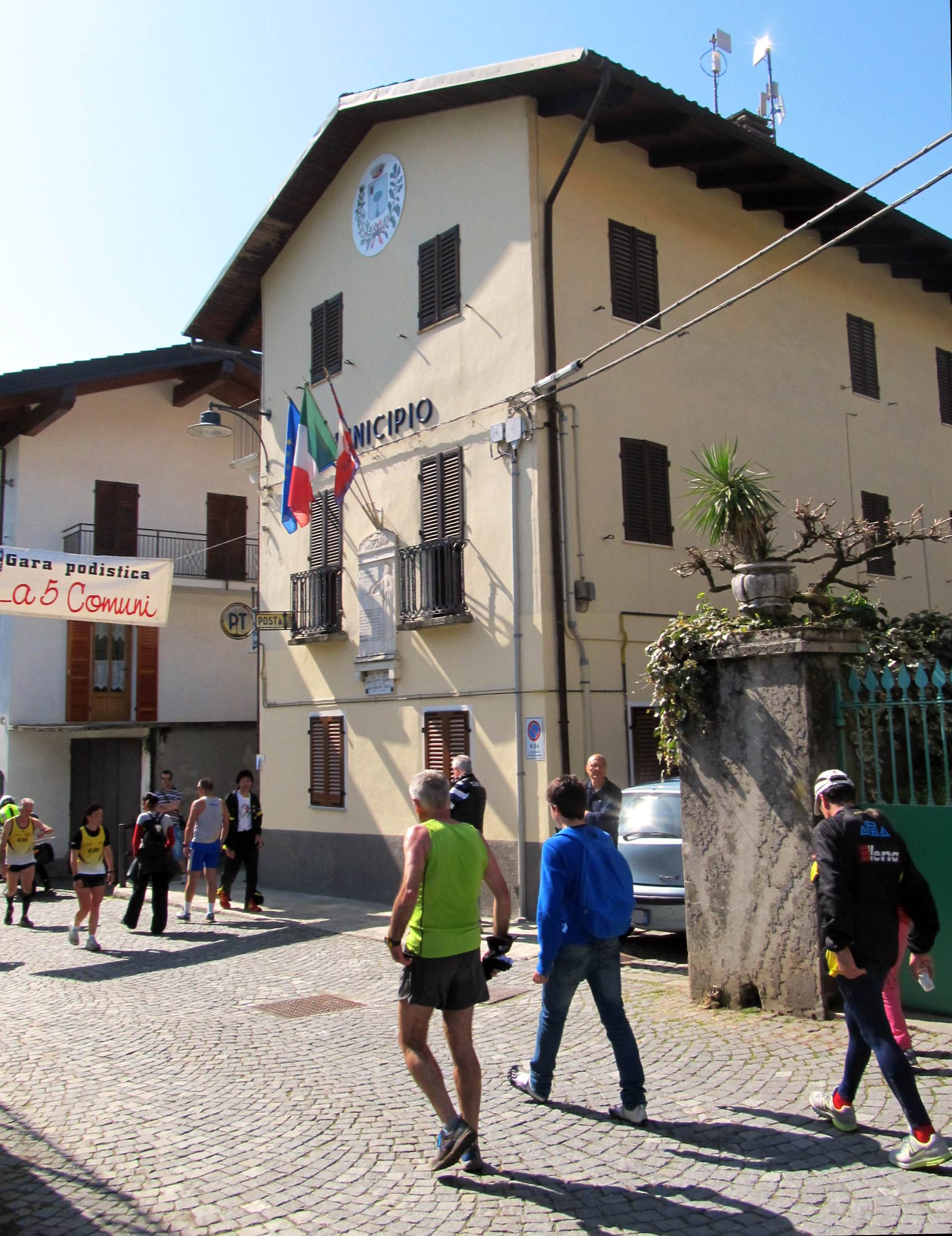

- Location within Italy Location within Piedmont
- Coordinates: 45°27′41.76″N 7°46′49.08″E
- Country: Italy
- Region: Piedmont
- Metropolitan city: Turin (TO)

Area
  - Total: 13.83 km^{2} (5.34 sq mi)
- Elevation: 650 m (2,130 ft)

Population (31 August 2017)
  - Total: 1,290
  - Density: 93.3/km^{2} (242/sq mi)
- Time zone: UTC+1 (CET)
  - Summer (DST): UTC+2 (CEST)
- Postal code: 10039
- Dialing code: 0125
- ISTAT code: 001317
- Website: Official website

Val di Chy is a comune (municipality) in the Metropolitan City of Turin in the Italian region Piedmont. It was created in January 2019 with the merger of the former comuni of Pecco, Alice Superiore and Lugnacco.
