= Strambinello =

- Comune
- Comune di Strambinello
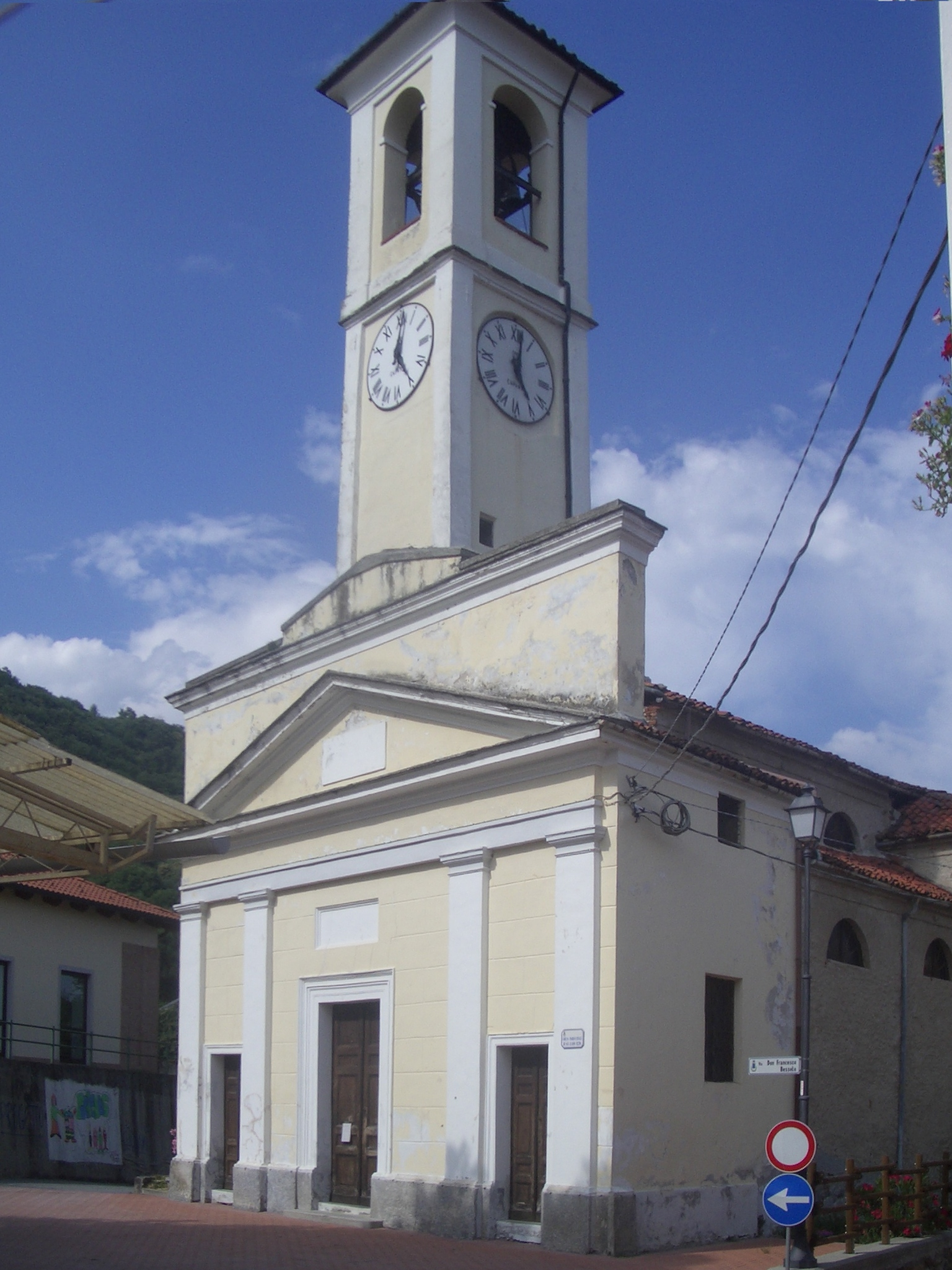
- Parish church

- Coat of arms

- Location within Italy Location within Piedmont
- Coordinates: 45°25′N 7°46′E
- Country: Italy
- Region: Piedmont
- Metropolitan city: Turin (TO)

Government
  - Mayor: Marco Angelo Corzetto

Area
  - Total: 2.21 km^{2} (0.85 sq mi)
- Elevation: 356 m (1,168 ft)

Population (Dec. 2004)
  - Total: 263
  - Density: 119/km^{2} (308/sq mi)
- Demonym: Strambinellesi
- Time zone: UTC+1 (CET)
  - Summer (DST): UTC+2 (CEST)
- Postal code: 10010
- Dialing code: 0125
- Website: Official website

Strambinello is a comune (municipality) in the Metropolitan City of Turin in the Italian region Piedmont, located about 40 km north of Turin.

Strambinello Castle is located in the comune.
