= Sakanazukan =

Compilation album by Sakanaction
- Released: March 28, 2018
- Recorded: 2006–2018
- Language: Japanese
- Label: NFRecords (Victor Entertainment)
- Producer: Sakanaction

Sakanaction chronology
Natsukashii Tsuki wa Atarashii Tsuki (2015)	Sakanazukan (2018)	834.194 (2019)

Sakanazukan (魚図鑑, "Fish Picture Book") is a compilation album by Japanese rock band Sakanaction. It was released on March 28, 2018, to commemorate the tenth anniversary of the band's major debut. Physical editions are accompanied by a fish-themed book about the music, in keeping with the band's name and frequent references to fish (sakana (魚) means fish in Japanese).

The compilation album is split into three discs, Asase (浅瀬, Shallows), Chūsō (中層, Medium Depth) and Shinkai (深海, Deep Sea), with the last being only included in the Limited Edition Premium Box. One new song Kagerou (陽炎), which was used as the theme song for the live-action adaptation of the fantasy manga Donten ni Warau, is also featured in the album. The album was considerably successful, topping both the Oricon and Billboard Japan Hot Albums charts.

The book, bearing English title Book of Fishes, contains artwork, information, and commentary about the songs on the release. Handwriting above the title of the book that comes with the 3-CD premium box indicates it is a "fish encyclopedia" (sakana daizukan (魚大図鑑)), whereas the editions with 2 CDs instead come with a condensed version designated as a "fish picture book" (sakana zukan (魚図鑑)).

== Track listing ==
All lyrics are written by Ichiro Yamaguchi

Disc 1: Shallows
No.	Title	Originating release	Length
1.	"Shin Takarajima" (新宝島 "New Treasure Island")	"Shin Takarajima" (2015)	5:02
2.	"Yoru no Odoriko" (夜の踊り子, "The Dancer of the Night")	"Yoru no Odoriko" (2012)	5:02
3.	"Aoi"	"Sakanaction" (2013)	4:15
4.	"Rookie" (ルーキー, Rūkī)	"Rookie" (2011)	5:20
5.	"Identity" (アイデンティティ Aidentiti)	"Identity" (2010)	4:13
6.	"Light Dance" (ライトダンス Raito Dansu)	"Shin-shiro" (2009)	3:32
7.	"Sen to Rei" (セントレイ, "1000 & 0")	"Sen to Rei" (2008)	4:01
8.	"Boku to Hana" (僕と花, "The Flower and I")	"Boku to Hana" (2012)	3:50
9.	"Bach no Senritsu o Yoru ni Kiita Sei Desu" (『バッハの旋律を夜に聴いたせいです。』 Bahha no Senritsu o Yoru ni Kiita Sei Desu., "It's Because of Listening to Bach Melodies at Night")	"Bach no Senritsu o Yoru ni Kiita Sei Desu" (2011)	3:59
10.	"Music" (ミュージック Myūjikku)	"Music" (2013)	5:23
11.	"Monochrome Tokyo" (モノクロトウキョー Monokuro Tōkyō)	"Documentaly" (2011)	3:58
12.	"Klee"	"Kikuuiki" (2010)	4:16
13.	"Omotesandō Nijūroku-ji" (表参道26時 Omotesandō 2:00am)	"Kikuuiki" (2010)	4:18
14.	"Aruku Around" (アルクアラウンド Aruku Araundo)	"Aruku Around" (2010)	4:25
15.	"Adventure" (アドベンチャー Adobenchā)	"Shin-shiro" (2009)	4:57
16.	"Night Fishing Is Good" (ナイトフィッシングイズグッド Naito Fisshingu Izu Guddo)	"Night Fishing Is Good" (2007)	6:19
17.	"Kagerou -movie version-" (陽炎 -movie version-)		3:31
Total length:			1:16:21

All tracks are written by Ichiro Yamaguchi

Disc 2: Medium Depth
No.	Title	Originating release	Length
1.	"Word" (ワード)	(2008)	4:30
2.	"Mikazuki Sunset" (三日月サンセット)	(2005)	3:48
3.	"Native Dancer" (ネイティブダンサー)	(2009)	4:24
4.	"Holy Dance" (ホーリーダンス)	(2011)	5:12
5.	"Nantettatte Haru" (なんてったって春)	(2013)	4:31
6.	"Sample" (サンプル Sanpuru)	(2008)	4:40
7.	"Shiranami Top Water" (白波トップウォーター)	(2007)	5:30
8.	"Yoru no Higashigawa" (夜の東側)	(2007)	4:08
9.	"Slow Motion" (スローモーション)	"Rookie" (2011)	5:18
10.	"Namida Delight" (涙ディライト)	(2009)	4:05
11.	"Ashita Kara" (明日から)	(2010)	4:02
12.	"Kamen no Machi" (仮面の街)	(2011)	3:36
13.	"Endless" (エンドレス)	(2011)	3:48
14.	"Years"	(2011)	4:22
15.	"Boil" (ボイル)	(2013)	3:30
16.	"Document" (ドキュメント)	(2011)	4:48
17.	"Me ga Aku Aiiro" (目が明く藍色)	(2010)	6:58
Total length:			1:17:10

== Charts and sales ==
Chart (2018)	Peak position
Japan Billboard Japan Hot Albums	1
Japan Billboard Japan Top Album Sales	1
Japan Billboard Japan Download Albums	2
Japan Oricon weekly albums	1

=== Sales ===
Chart	Amount
Oricon physical sales	73,000
SoundScan	74,000

== Release history ==
Region	Date	Format	Catalog No.	JAN/EAN
Japan	March 28, 2018	Premium Edition: 3 CDs + Fish Encyclopedia [VIZY-491] + special box	VIZL-1370	4988002761517
Japan	March 28, 2018	1st Edition Limited Edition: 2 CDs + Blu-Ray + Fish Picture Book [VIZL-1371/1372] + slipcase	VIZL-1371	4988002761531
Japan	March 28, 2018	1st Edition Limited Edition: 2 CDs + DVD + Fish Picture Book [VIZL-1371/1372] + slipcase	VIZL-1372	4988002761548
Japan	March 28, 2018	Limited Pressing: 2 CDs + Fish Picture Book [VICL-64991~2] + slipcase	VICL-64991	4988002761524
Worldwide	March 28, 2018	Digital Download	–	–
Japan	April 14, 2018	Rental Edition: 2 CDs + Fish Picture Book [VICL-64991~2] + slipcase	VICL-64991	4988002761524
