= "Fish Alive" 30min., 1 Sequence by 6 Songs Sakanaquarium 2009 @ Sapporo =

EP by Sakanaction
- Released: July 15, 2009
- Recorded: March 21, 2009
- Genres: Techno, electronica, post-rock
- Length: 30:04
- Language: Japanese
- Label: Victor Entertainment
- Producer: Sakanaction

Sakanaction chronology
Shin-shiro (2009)	"Fish Alive" 30min., 1 Sequence by 6 Songs Sakanaquarium 2009 @ Sapporo (2009)	Kikuuiki (2010)

'"Fish Alive" 30min., 1 Sequence by 6 Songs Sakanaquarium 2009 @ Sapporo (stylized as "FISH ALIVE"30min., 1 sequence by 6 songs SAKANAQUARIUM 2009@SAPPORO) is a live extended play by Japanese band Sakanaction. It was released on July 15, 2009 through Victor Entertainment and an exclusive digital download to iTunes.

== Background and production ==
In 2008, Sakanaction released their first live extended play, 'Night Fishing Is Good' Tour 2008 in Sapporo, on August 6, 2008. This release featured material taken from the band's tour for their second album Night Fishing, and was recorded on March 8, 2008, at Penny Lane 24 in Sapporo. This was quickly followed with Remixion, an extended play featuring remixes of songs, released digitally on October 5.

In January 2009, the band released their third studio album Shin-shiro. To promote this, the band performed a national tour of Japan in February and March 2009, entitled Sakanaquarium 2009: Shinshiro. The 13 date tour began in Kyoto on February 14, and ended with two performances in Sapporo on March 20 and 21. Live audio from the tour final on March 21, 2009 at Penny Lane 24 in Sapporo was compiled into a thirty-minute single track to create the "Fish Alive" 30min., 1 Sequence by 6 Songs Sakanaquarium 2009 @ Sapporo release. The songs featured were "Ame(B)", "Light Dance", "Inner World", "Sample", "Minnanouta" and "Night Fishing Is Good". "Ame(B)", "Light Dance" and "Minnanouta" were all taken from Shin-shiro, however "Inner World" was originally from the band's debut album Go to the Future (2007), and "Sample" and "Night Fishing Is Good" from their second album Night Fishing (2008).

== Release and reception ==
The extended play was released on July 15, 2009. On the same day, videos of the songs "Sen to Rei", "Native Dancer" and "Adventure" taken from the same concert were released as stand-alone digital downloads. These three songs were similarly compiled into a single track, lasting fourteen minutes. The release was commercially successful on iTunes, charting at number two on the overall Japan chart, after the band had performed at the Nano-Mugen Festival organised by Asian Kung-Fu Generation, held at the Yokohama Arena on July 20.

== Track listing ==
All tracks are written by Ichiro Yamaguchi.

No.	Title	Length
1.	""Fish Alive" 30min., 1 Sequence by 6 Songs Sakanaquarium 2009 @ Sapporo"	30:14
Total length:		30:14

== Release history ==
Region	Date	Format	Distributing Label	Catalog codes
Japan	July 15, 2009	digital download	Victor Entertainment	VEAML-23251
