= Remixion =

EP by Sakanaction
- Released: October 15, 2008
- Recorded: 2008
- Genre: Techno, electronica, post-rock
- Length: 14:16
- Language: Japanese
- Label: BabeStar Label
- Producer: Sakanaction

Sakanaction chronology
| 'Night Fishing Is Good' Tour 2008 in Sapporo (2008) | Remixion (2008) | Shin-shiro (2009) |

Remixion (stylized as REMIXion, Japanese pronunciation: [ɾimiꜜkkɯ̥ɕoɴ]) is a remix extended play by Japanese band Sakanaction. It was released on October 5, 2008, through Victor Entertainment sublabel BabeStar exclusively as a paid download.

== Background and production ==
Sakanaction was first formed in the summer of 2005 in Sapporo, Hokkaido, and released their debut album Go to the Future in May 2007. For the rest of the year, the band worked on the production of their second album Night Fishing, which was released only half a year after their debut work, in January 2008. In August 2008, Sakanaction released their first digital exclusive extended play, 'Night Fishing Is Good' Tour 2008 in Sapporo, a release that compiled live takes of songs performed at their March 8, 2008 concert at Penny Lane 24 in Sapporo. The extended play was commercially successful, managing to top iTunes Japan's rock chart, surpassing British band Coldplay's Viva la Vida or Death and All His Friends (2008).

Remixion featured remixes of two songs, "Mikazuki Sunset" from Go to the Future (2007) and "Sample" from Night Fishing (2008). "Mikazuki Sunset" was remixed by Japanese DJ Fantastic Plastic Machine, and "Sample" by Sapporo-based DJ Kuniyuki. Fantastic Plastic Machine uploaded the remix of "Mikazuki Sunset" to his official MySpace to promote the release. Kuniyuki re-released his remix of "Sample" on his 2013 vinyl record Remix Collection. Both songs from the extended play were compiled on the band's compilation album Natsukashii Tsuki wa Atarashii Tsuki: Coupling & Remix Works (2015).

== Track listing ==
All tracks are written by Ichiro Yamaguchi.

| No. | Title | Length |
|---|---|---|
| 1. | "Mikazuki Sunset (FPM Everlust Mix)" (三日月サンセット, "Crescent Moon Sunset") | 6:05 |
| 2. | "Sample (Cosmic Version)" (サンプル Sanpuru) | 8:11 |
| Total length: | | 14:16 |

== Release history ==
| Region | Date | Format | Distributing Label | Catalogue codes |
|---|---|---|---|---|
| Japan | October 15, 2008 | digital download | BabeStar Label | VEAML-22605 |
| South Korea | May 1, 2009 | digital download | J-Box Entertainment | |
