= Night Fishing =

Night Fishing may refer to:

- Night Fishing (album), 2008 album of Japanese rock band Sakanaction
  - "Night Fishing Is Good", the third single from the album
- NF Records (short for Night Fishing Records), a label under Victor Entertainment responsible for Sakanaction
- Night Fishing (film), 2011 South Korean short film
