= Night Fishing Is Good =

Single by Sakanaction

from the album Night Fishing
- Released: December 26, 2007
- Recorded: 2007
- Length: 5:06
- Label: BabeStar Label
- Songwriter: Ichiro Yamaguchi
- Producer: Sakanaction

Sakanaction singles chronology
"Sample" / "Word" (2007)	"Night Fishing Is Good" (2007)	"Sen to Rei" (2008)

"Night Fishing Is Good" (Japanese: ナイトフィッシングイズグッド, Hepburn: Naito Fisshingu Izu Guddo) (Japanese pronunciation: [naitoɸiꜜɕɕiŋɡɯ izɯ ɡɯꜜddo]) is a song by Japanese band Sakanaction. It was released as a digital single on December 26, 2007, as the third of three pre-release songs from the band's second album Night Fishing (2008), released a month later.

The song was written by the band's vocalist and songwriter Ichiro Yamaguchi to mimic the emotions of fishing, inspired by musicals and classical music. Musically, the band were inspired by the English rock band Queen, adding guitar riffs and choral vocals similar to the style of Queen. The song was the first instance of Sakanaction using choral vocals in their music.

Yamaguchi wanted the song to act as the leading promotional song from Night Fishing; however, the band's record label insisted on the song "Sample" instead. Yamaguchi personally pushed for the song to have a music video. He enlisted the director Yoshihiro Mori to create a video with little notice, and together they created a fishing-themed documentary-style video shot in Gifu, which was released on February 4. The song was praised by music critics, who likened the classical phrases and choral vocals to Queen's "Bohemian Rhapsody" (1975).

== Background and development ==
Sakanaction was first formed in 2005 in Sapporo, Hokkaido. The band gained exposure in Hokkaido after winning the audition to perform as a newcomer artist at the Rising Sun Rock Festival in Otaru in August 2006, and after demos of their songs "Mikazuki Sunset" and "Shiranami Top Water" performed well on College Radio Japan Sapporo. The band were signed to major label Victor Entertainment, and released their debut album Go to the Future on May 7, 2007, through Victor's BabeStar Label. The album was primarily promoted with the song "Mikazuki Sunset", which was widely played on radio stations in Hokkaido in May. On Go to the Future and Night Fishing, Sakanaction based themselves in Sapporo, and recorded their albums there.

Due to the response to the band's debut album Go to the Future, Sakanaction's A&R team pushed them to quickly follow this up with a second album. The majority of the songs present on the album were written specifically as an album, as opposed to the compilation-like nature of Go to the Future. The material for the album was created based on the response and criticism for their debut album, and the members realization that they should not be frightened to make bold changes. On December 5, 2007, the songs "Word" and "Sample" were released as a two-track single to iTunes.

== Writing and inspiration ==
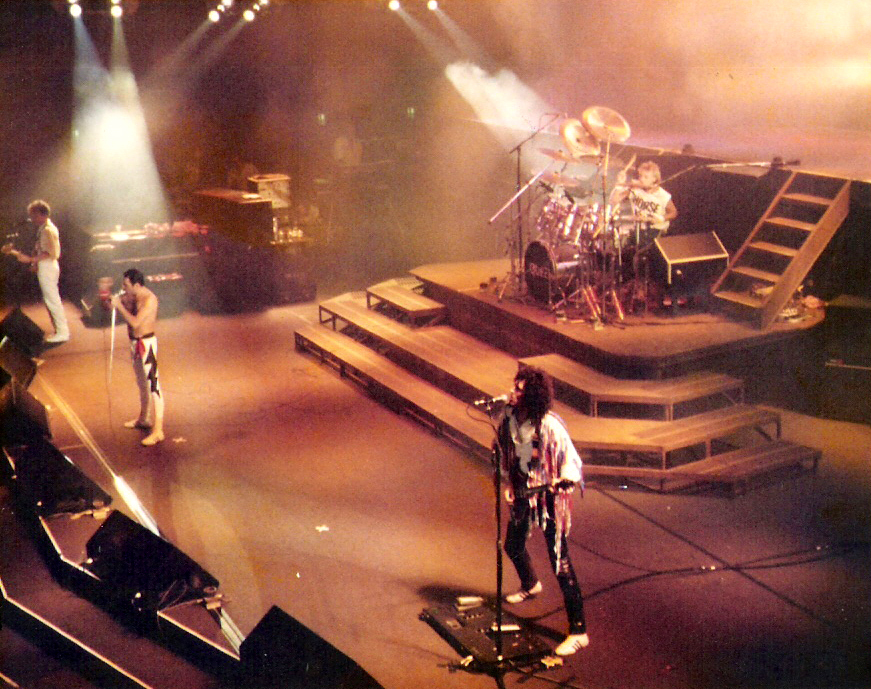
The arrangement of the song was inspired by English rock band Queen.

For the song "Night Fishing Is Good", Yamaguchi wanted to create a song that mimicked the emotions of fishing: initially deep in meditative thought that is suddenly broken when a fish gets hooked, and finally experiencing joy at catching the fish. Guitarist Motoharu Iwadera was the member who spent the most time contributing to the production of the song, and the band tried to have as much fun as possible with the arrangement. Yamaguchi quickly wrote the song after reading a review in Musica of Clammbon's album Musical (2007). He had wanted to make a song inspired by musicals and classical music, however felt that Clammbon might have beaten him to the punch. "Night Fishing Is Good" was one of several Sakanaction songs where he created the music and lyrics simultaneously; it was only later that the band chose to use part of the title as the title of its parent album, Night Fishing. The other members of Sakanaction were hesitant about the song first, after hearing how complex it was when Yamaguchi performed it solo on guitar during studio demo sessions, and suggested that they split it into two songs. Part way through the song's recording, Yamaguchi was suddenly inspired to make the song similar to music of English rock band Queen, which pianist Okazaki responded well to. Iwadera added Queen-style guitar riffs to the song, and the group decided to add chorus work in the style of Queen. The band attempted to incorporate all of Sakanaction's musical aspects into the song, by including folk, dance and pop elements.

"Night Fishing Is Good" is the first song released by the band where they used a vocal chorus, though in retrospect Yamaguchi considered the chorus work rough compared to their later songs. The vocal chorus was primarily sung by three of the band members: Ami Kusakari, Emi Okazaki and Motoharu Iwadera, with drummer Keiichi Ejima adding additional lower vocals to certain sections.

== Promotion and release ==
"Sample" was chosen by the band's management to be the leading promotional track from Night Fishing, despite Yamaguchi's protests as he had wanted "Night Fishing Is Good" to be in its place. Yamaguchi had begun to realize the power of music videos after the rise in popularity of video-sharing websites such as YouTube, so decided to make his own low-budget video for the song; describing "Night Fishing Is Good" as the underground leading promotional song for the album. On December 5, "Word" and "Sample" were released as a double A-side digital single to iTunes, while "Night Fishing Is Good" was released as a digital single four weeks later, on December 26.

The band have released four live recordings of the song. The first was a part of the track list of the band's iTunes-exclusive live EPs 'Night Fishing Is Good' Tour 2008 in Sapporo (2008), and the second is a segment of the single track "Fish Alive" 30min., 1 Sequence by 6 Songs Sakanaquarium 2009 @ Sapporo (2009) live EP. Performances of the song are present on two of the band's video albums: Sakanaquarium (C), footage of the band's concert held at Shinkiba Studio Coast on May 15, 2010, as a part of their Sakanaquarium 2010 tour, and their Sakanaquarium 2013 Sakanaction: Live at Makuhari Messe 2013.5.19 video album.

A year and a half after its release, "Night Fishing Is Good" was compiled onto Nano–Mugen Compilation 2009, an album featuring songs by acts performing at Asian Kung-Fu Generation's annual Nano-Mugen festival that year. The song is also present on FM802 Midnight Garage 10th Anniversary Compilation (2012), a compilation album celebrating 10 years of the FM802 radio program Midnight Garage. In 2015, a remix of the song produced by Sakanaction's guitarist Motoharu Iwadera, "Night Fishing Is Good (Iw_Remix)", was featured on their compilation album Natsukashii Tsuki wa Atarashii Tsuki: Coupling & Remix Works.

== Music video ==
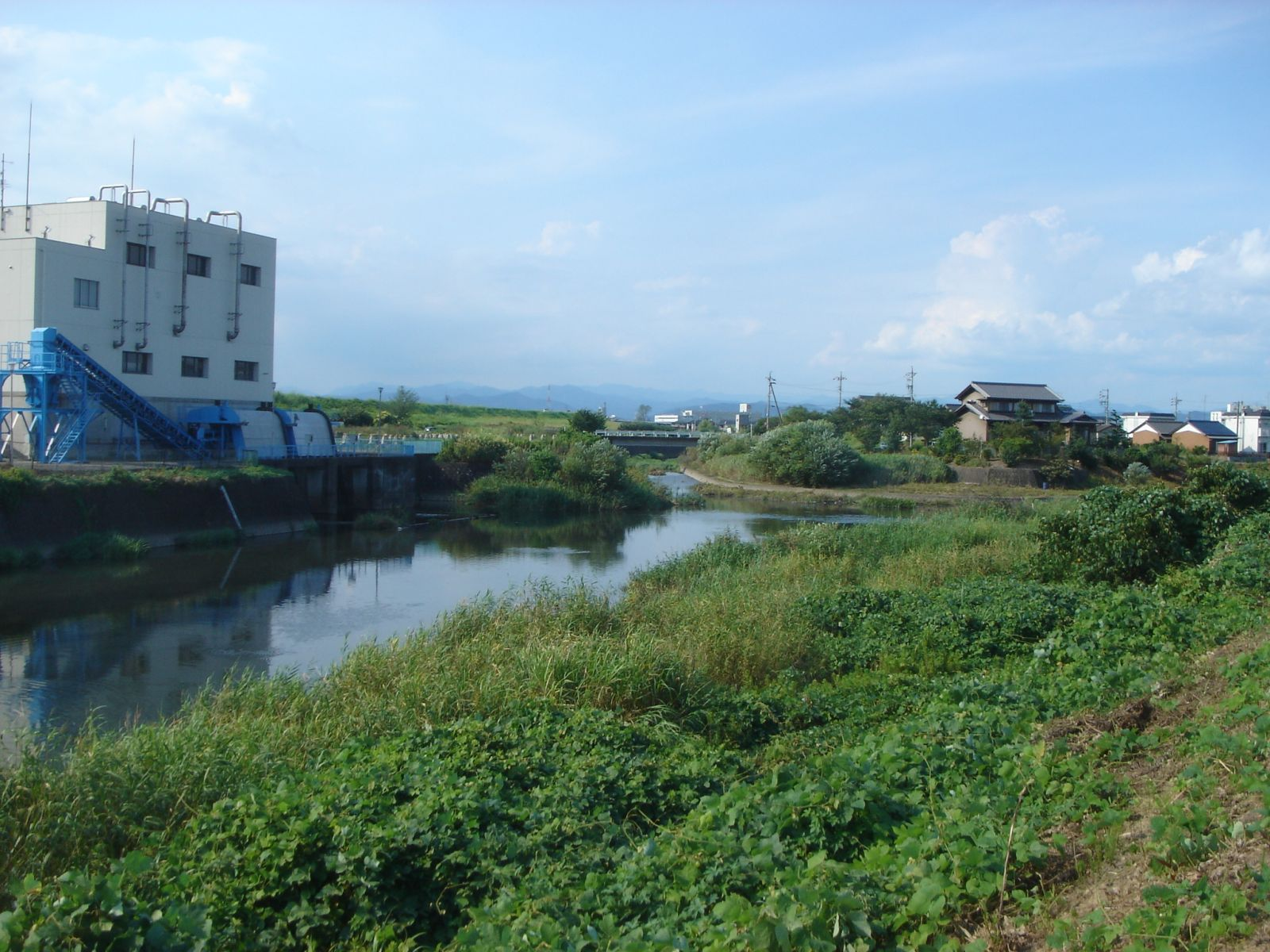
"Night Fishing Is Good" was shot at the Arata River in Gifu.

The music video for the song was directed by Yoshihiro Mori, who had collaborated with the band on their debut music video for the song "Mikazuki Sunset" (2007). "Night Fishing Is Good" was shot in a single day during the new year period in 2008 at the Arata River in Gifu, in two takes. The offer to Mori was very last minute, and was instigated by Yamaguchi himself. Yamaguchi asked Mori to create a music video showing him in the act of genuinely catching a fish. Mori used a handheld camera to film the video, to give it a documentary-like effect, and filmed three different sequences to reflect the three segments in the song. The music video was released on February 4, after its parent album Night Fishing was already available in stores.

The video begins by showing Yamaguchi fishing at dawn on a bridge in a suburban area, while he lip-synchs to the song. He is met by a middle-aged man (played by actor Yuya Matsuura), who tries to offer him an orange and talk to him. A fish then bites on Yamaguchi's line, and the pair are excited. During the second sequence, the footage of the first scene is shown sped-up and reversed. Mori intended for the reversed scenes of Yamaguchi singing the song to create a feeling of uneasiness. The video continues to reverse, showing footage of Yamaguchi walking towards the bridge to fish, ending in a scene where his mouth synchs up with the song's lyrics, despite the footage being in reverse. The third sequence shows Yamaguchi capturing the fish, and ends with him triumphantly holding up the Asian carp he had just caught.

== Critical reception ==
Haruki Terada of Musica praised the song's classical phrases and choral vocals, likening it to Queen. Entertainment Media Kulture named the song one of Sakanaction's early signature songs, feeling that it was "a large-scale song" in the vein of Queen's "Bohemian Rhapsody" (1975). The reviewers felt that the song's motivational lyrics could make it interpreted as a fight song.

== Track listing ==
- Digital download
1. "Night Fishing Is Good" – 6:18

== Personnel ==
Personnel details were sourced from Night Fishing's liner notes booklet. Music video personnel details were sourced from Sakanarchive 2007—2011: Sakanaction Music Video Collection (Limited Edition).

=== Song credits ===
- Brown Post – mixing, recording
- Keiichi Ejima – drums
- Motoharu Iwadera – guitar
- Yasumura Kubota – executive producer (BabeStar)
- Ami Kusakari – bass guitar
- Yujiro Mitsugi – manager
- Emi Okazaki – keyboards
- Sakanaction – arrangement, production
- Takeshi Takagaki – supervisor (BabeStar)
- Ichiro Yamaguchi – vocals, guitar, songwriting

=== Music video ===
- Yuya Matsuura – cast member
- Yoshihiro Mori – director
- Tomonori Nambu – cameraman
- Ichiro Yamaguchi – cast member

== Release history ==
Region	Date	Format	Distributing Label	Catalog codes
Japan	December 26, 2007	digital download	Victor Entertainment	VEAML-21940
