= Sample (Sakanaction song) =

- "Word" / "Sample" digital download cover

Single by Sakanaction

from the album Night Fishing
- Released: December 5, 2007
- Recorded: 2007
- Genre: Pop, dance, electronica, post-rock
- Length: 4:41
- Label: Victor Entertainment
- Songwriter: Ichiro Yamaguchi
- Producer: Sakanaction

Sakanaction singles chronology
"Sample" / "Word" (2007)	"Night Fishing Is Good" (2007)

"Sample" (Japanese: サンプル, Hepburn: Sanpuru) (Japanese pronunciation: [sampɯɾɯ]) is a song by Japanese band Sakanaction. Originally a song recorded by Sakanaction's vocalist Ichiro Yamaguchi's high-school band Dutchman in 2002, it was later released by Sakanaction on December 5, 2007, as a double A-side digital single alongside "Word", two months before the band's second album Night Fishing. As the leading promotional track from Night Fishing, "Sample" was heavily promoted on radio stations in Hokkaido in February, however did not receive noticeable national airplay. Since its release, "Sample" has become a staple of the band's live concert set-lists.

== Background and development ==
Sakanaction was first formed in 2005 in Sapporo, Hokkaido. The band gained exposure in Hokkaido after winning the audition to perform as a newcomer artist at the Rising Sun Rock Festival in Otaru in August 2006, and after demos of their songs "Mikazuki Sunset" and "Shiranami Top Water" performed well on College Radio Japan Sapporo. The band were signed to major label Victor Entertainment, and released their debut album Go to the Future on May 7, 2007, through Victor's BabeStar Label. The album was primarily promoted with the song "Mikazuki Sunset", which was widely promoted on radio stations in Hokkaido in May. On Go to the Future and Night Fishing, Sakanaction based themselves in Sapporo, and recorded their albums there.

Due to the response to the band's debut album Go to the Future, Sakanaction's A&R team pushed them to quickly follow this up with a second album. The majority of the songs present on the album were written specifically as an album, as opposed to the compilation-like nature of Go to the Future. The material for the album was created based on the response and criticism for their debut album, and the members realization that they should not be frightened to make bold changes.

== Writing and production ==
"Sample" was first written and recorded in 2002, by Yamaguchi's high school band Dutchman. It was released by the band on December 1, 2002, as an audition-exclusive double A-side, alongside the song "Inner World", and featured some of Yamaguchi's earliest experiments with synthesizer samples and four on the floor rhythm patterns.

The song "Sample" had many different arrangements initially. As they had not intended for the song to becoming the leading promotional track, they had decided to use an arrangement with strong synthesizer sounds, instead of a more easy to process, commercial sound. Originally Yamaguchi had wanted to make the song faster, but after finding that speeding up the song distorted the song's melody and lyrical impression, settled on 126BPM.

== Promotion and release ==
"Sample" was chosen by the band's management to be the leading promotional track from Night Fishing, despite Yamaguchi's protests as he had wanted "Night Fishing Is Good" to be in its place. On December 5, the songs "Word" and "Sample" were released as a two-track single to iTunes. "Sample" began receiving major radio airplay in Hokkaido in January, peaking at number five on the Sapporo Hot 100 airplay and sales chart. Radio data compiler Plantech tracked "Sample" as being the song with the sixth highest airplay in Hokkaido between January 20 and 27, despite not having any noticeable airplay success nationally.

"Sample" was used as credits music for two programs in Japan: the Chiba Television Broadcasting program Music-03 as their ending theme song, as well as by the Mainichi Broadcasting System program Music Edge + Osaka Style for their opening. Sakanaction performed "Sample" on Fuji Television's music program Factory on February 26, 2008.

Since its release, "Sample" has been a staple of the band's live concerts, and five recordings have been released: the first two on the 'Night Fishing Is Good' Tour 2008 in Sapporo (2008) and "Fish Alive" 30min., 1 Sequence by 6 Songs Sakanaquarium 2009 @ Sapporo (2009) digital extended plays, followed by the video album recordings of Sakanaction's concerts at Shinkiba Studio Coast on May 15, 2010, and the Nippon Budokan on October 8, 2010, featured on their DVDs Sakanaquarium (B) and Sakanaquarium (C) (2011). The song was absent from the band's set-lists for several years, until it was revived for their Sakanatribe 2014: Live at Tokyo Dome City Hall tour, released as a video album in July of the same year. A remix of the song entitled "Sample (Cosmic Version)" was featured on the band's remix EP Remixion (2008). Remixed by Sapporo-based DJ Kuniyuki, the remix was later compiled on Kuniyuki's 2013 vinyl record Remix Collection, and Sakanaction's compilation album Natsukashii Tsuki wa Atarashii Tsuki: Coupling & Remix Works (2015).

The band re-arranged the song for their performance at the Taicoclub outdoor music festival, held at Kiso, Nagano on May 31 and June 1, 2014. This version was reprised at their August festival performances at Sonicmania and the Rising Sun Rock Festival, and was jokingly dubbed the "maniac version" by Yamaguchi. The band liked the live arrangement they had created for the song, so they decided to broadcast this version on their Ustream channel on August 5, collaborating with their live arrangement recording engineer Sachio "Sunny" Sasaki. This live recording session was included in the DVD for their single "Sayonara wa Emotion" / "Hasu no Hana", released in October 2014.

== Music video ==
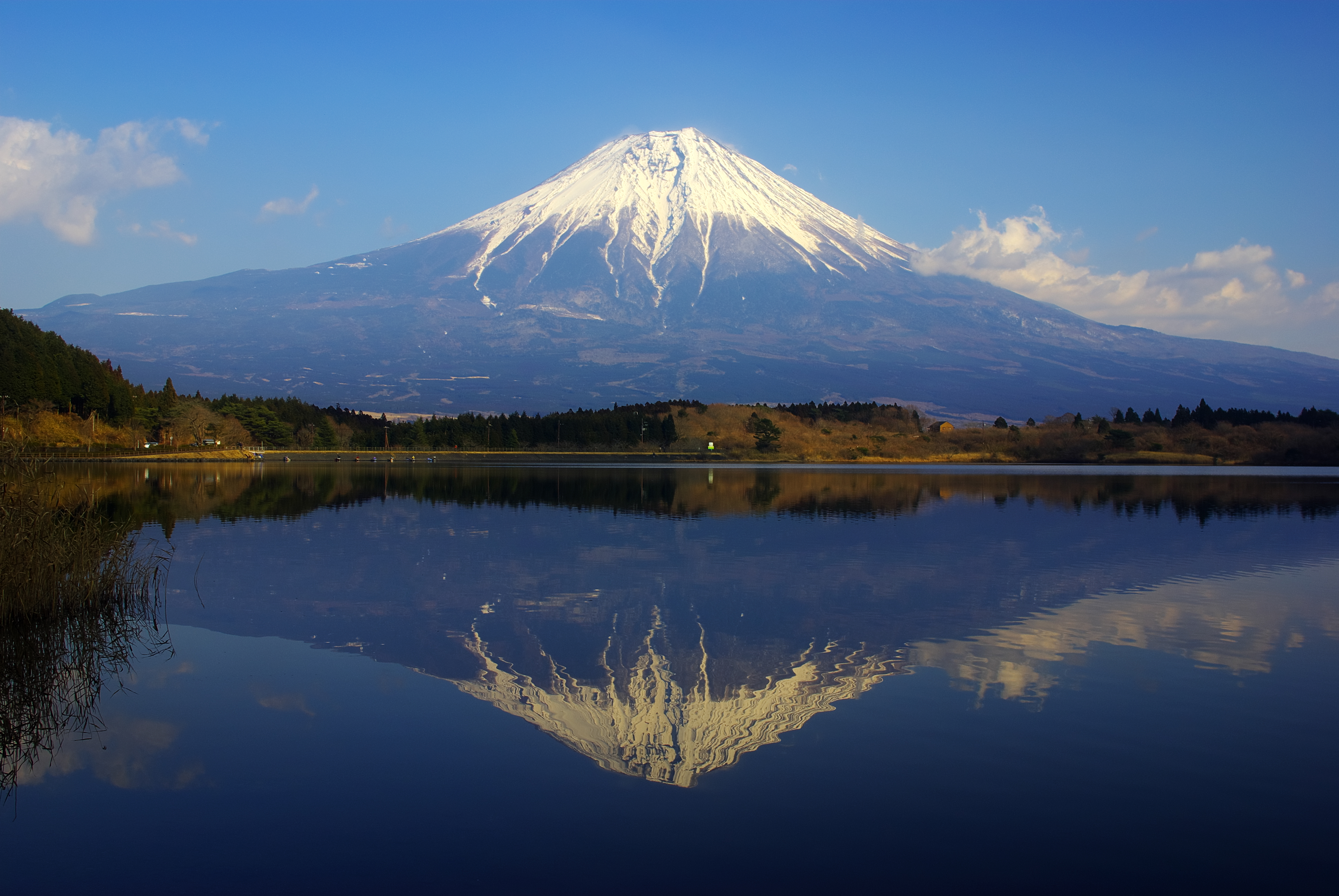
The music video for "Sample" was shot in Shizuoka Prefecture close to Mount Fuji.

The music video for the song was directed by Kanji Sutō. It was recorded on December 20, 2007, at a lake close to Mount Fuji in Shizuoka Prefecture. Sutō wanted to express Yamaguchi's love of fishing in the video, so themed the video around this. All of the fishing gear shown in the video were owned by Yamaguchi personally. The video begins by showing an iridescent scene of Mount Fuji at dawn, reflected in a lake. Yamaguchi walks by himself along with his fishing gear to a pier next to the lake, and begins walking in circles. As he nods his head to the beat of the music, his knit cap changes color. The final section of the song shows Yamaguchi fishing at night, as well as shots of rows of lights transposed onto Yamaguchi's face as he sings the song.

"Sample" was heavily promoted on the music video channel Space Shower in January 2008.

== Critical reception ==
Entertainment Media Kulture named "Sample" as one of Sakanaction's early signature songs, feeling that Yamaguchi's lyrics were both emotional and literary, and that the song gave a somehow warm feeling to the listener.

== Track listing ==
All tracks are written by Ichiro Yamaguchi.

"Word" / "Sample" digital download
No.	Title	Length
1.	"Word" (ワード Wādo)	4:32
2.	"Sample"	4:41
Total length:		9:13

== Personnel ==
Personnel details were sourced from Night Fishing's liner notes booklet, while music video personnel were sourced from Sakanarchive 2007—2011: Sakanaction Music Video Collection.

Sakanaction

- All members – arrangement, production
- Keiichi Ejima – drums
- Motoharu Iwadera – guitar
- Ami Kusakari – bass guitar
- Emi Okazaki – keyboards
- Ichiro Yamaguchi – vocals, guitar, songwriting

Music video personnel

- Tetsu Moritera – lighting
- Isao Okudaira – cameraman
- Kanji Sutō – director
- Koji Takayama – producer
- TC.Max – production company

== Release history ==
Region	Date	Format	Distributing Label	Catalog codes
Japan	December 5, 2007	digital download	Victor Entertainment	VEAML-21941
