= Natsukashii Tsuki wa Atarashii Tsuki: Coupling & Remix Works =

Compilation album by Sakanaction
- Released: August 5, 2015
- Recorded: 2008–2015
- Length: 125:12
- Language: Japanese
- Label: Victor Entertainment
- Producer: Sakanaction

Sakanaction chronology
| Sakanaction (2013) | Natsukashii Tsuki wa Atarashii Tsuki: Coupling & Remix Works (2015) | Sakanazukan (2018) |

Natsukashii Tsuki wa Atarashii Tsuki: Coupling & Remix Works (懐かしい月は新しい月 ～Coupling & Remix works～; "A Nostalgic Moon Is a New Moon") (Japanese pronunciation: [natsɯ̥kaɕiꜜː tsɯ̥kiꜜ wa ataɾaɕiꜜː tsɯ̥kiꜜ])) is a compilation album by Japanese band Sakanaction, featuring B-sides, remixes and rarities released throughout their career. It was released on August 5, 2015 through Victor Entertainment.

The collection features three discs of material: Tsuki no Namigata: Coupling & Unreleased Works (月の波形 ～Coupling & Unreleased works～; "Ripples of the Moon"), a compilation of all of the B-sides featured on the band's 10 physically released singles between 2008 and 2014 and unreleased material, Tsuki no Hen'yō: Remix Works (月の変容 ～Remix works～; "The Changing of the Moon"), a compilation of the band's remixes including several new works and a visual disc, Tsuki no Keshiki: Documentary of "Go to the Future (2006 Ver.)" & Music Videos (月の景色 ～Documentary of "GO TO THE FUTURE（2006 ver.）" & MUSIC VIDEOS～; "A View of the Moon").

== Background and development ==
In early January 2015 the band's bassist Ami Kusakari announced her pregnancy, which caused the band to halt all of their live concerts until October. This led to several re-releases by the band: Sakanaction's album discography was released in a lossless digital format on March 18, followed by CD and LP record re-releases of their first three studio albums Go to the Future, Night Fishing and Shin-shiro on March 25. Originally the band had planned on releasing a new studio album in late March, but instead re-released these album to fulfill contractual obligations.

Apart from the previously released material, the album features several alternate takes of songs arranged by individual members: "Night Fishing Is Good" by guitarist Motoharu Iwadera, "Music" by drummer Keiichi Ejima and "Identity" by bassist Ami Kusakari. Four unpublished remixes are present on the album's Tsuki no Hen'yō disc, including an electronic remix of "Yoru no Odoriko" by Agraph, a remix of "Sayonara wa Emotion" by Qrion, and a new version of "Light Dance" by Yoshinori Sunahara, who had previously remixed the song in 2011 for the band's "Bach no Senritsu o Yoru ni Kiita Sei Desu" single. Tsuki no Namigata features a track called "Go to the Future (2006 Ver.)", a live acoustic recording of the song with only vocalist Ichiro Yamaguchi and guitarist Iwadera, in the style that they had performed the song in 2006 when Sakanaction had been only a two-member group. Recording footage of this live performance is also included on the album's visual disc.

The album's visual disc features new music videos for the songs "Holy Dance", "Years" and "Slow Motion", as well as the video for "Eureka", set to a demo take of the song, "Eureka (Minimal Demo)". The video for "Holy Dance" was directed by Yamaguchi personally.

== Promotion and release ==
A remix of the band's song "Good-Bye" was used as the theme song for the NHK documentary special Next World: Watashi-tachi no Mirai (NEXT WORLD 私たちの未来; "Our Future") in January and February 2015, which was first compiled on Natsukashii Tsuki wa Atarashii Tsuki. LP record reissues of the band's studio albums Kikuuiki, Documentaly and Sakanaction were released simultaneously on the same day as Natsukashii Tsuki wa Atarashii Tsuki: Coupling & Remix Works. Tsuki no Namigata: Coupling & Unreleased Works and Tsuki no Hen'yō: Remix Works were released as digital downloads on the same day as the album's physical release, however compiled as two separate albums.

After Kusakari gave birth to a boy in June, the band made the announcement that they planned to perform a 24-date tour across Japan, Sakanaquarium 2015-2016. The tour began at the Hokkaido Prefectural Sports Center in Sapporo on October 2, and featured dates at the Osaka-jō Hall, the Nippon Budokan and Yamaguchi's hometown of Otaru, Hokkaido.

On July 15, the music video for "Years" was uploaded to YouTube, directed by filmmaker Tomokazu Yamada. This was followed by "Slow Motion" on July 18, a video shot onto 8 mm film and directed by photographer Yoshiyuki Okuyama, and Yamaguchi's self-directed video for "Holy Dance" on July 23. "Holy Dance" was promoted on radio stations across Japan, managing to reach number 62 on the Billboard Radio Songs chart.

== Critical reception ==
Yuichi Hirayama of EMTG gave the album a positive review. He had been eagerly awaiting "Good-Bye (Next World Remix)" ever since its use in the NHK documentary in January, and felt that the remix was "impressive" and tied in well with the documentary's technological focus. He felt that the B-sides compiled on Tsuki no Namigata were what the band wanted to express musically, free from the restraints of commercial considerations that a single's A side needs. He felt that the B-sides expressed "individuality", and that many of the songs had enough "power" to be released as singles in their own right, citing "Holy Dance" as an example. Hirayama felt that the remix disc expressed the importance of "revealing another face to songs".

== Track listing ==
All lyrics are written by Ichiro Yamaguchi.

Tsuki no Namigata: Coupling & Unreleased Works
| No. | Title | Music | Originating release | Length |
|---|---|---|---|---|
| 1. | "Holy Dance" (ホーリーダンス Hōrī Dansu) | Yamaguchi | "Identity" (2010) | 5:14 |
| 2. | "Ame (A)" ("Rain (A)") | Yamaguchi | "Sen to Rei" (2008) | 3:31 |
| 3. | "Multiple Exposure" | Yamaguchi | "Yoru no Odoriko" (2012) | 5:20 |
| 4. | "Years" | Yamaguchi | "Bach no Senritsu o Yoru ni Kiita Sei Desu." (2011) | 4:22 |
| 5. | "Eiga (Conté 2012/11/16 17:24)" (映画(コンテ 2012/11/16 17:24), "Film") | Yamaguchi | "Music" (2013) | 5:07 |
| 6. | "Slow Motion" (スローモーション Surō Mōshon) | Yamaguchi | "Rookie" (2011) | 5:19 |
| 7. | "Modokashii Hibi" (もどかしい日々, "Irritating Days") | Yamaguchi | "Sen to Rei" (2008) | 5:04 |
| 8. | "Spoon to Ase" (スプーンと汗, "Spoon and Sweat") | Yamaguchi | "Aruku Around" (2010) | 3:19 |
| 9. | "Neptunus" (ネプトゥーヌス Neputūnusu) | Yamaguchi | "Boku to Hana" (2012) | 6:05 |
| 10. | "Montage" | Sakanaction | "Rookie" (2011) | 6:14 |
| 11. | "Night Fishing Is Good (Iw_Remix)" (ナイトフィッシングイズグッド Naito Fisshingu Izu Guddo) | Yamaguchi | | 6:03 |
| 12. | "Music (Ej_Remix)" (ミュージック Myūjikku) | Yamaguchi | | 5:21 |
| 13. | "Identity (Ks_Remix)" (アイデンティティ Aidentiti) | Yamaguchi | | 5:23 |
| 14. | "Go to the Future (2006 Ver.)" | Yamaguchi | | 3:35 |
| Total length: | | | | 69:58 |

All tracks are written by Ichiro Yamaguchi.

Tsuki no Hen'yō: Remix Works
| No. | Title | Originating release | Length |
|---|---|---|---|
| 1. | "Good-Bye (Next World Remix)" (グッドバイ Guddobai) | | 5:34 |
| 2. | "Ame (B) (Sakanatribe x ATM Version)" | "Sayonara wa Emotion" / "Hasu no Hana" (2014) | 8:11 |
| 3. | "Rookie (Takkyu Ishino Remix)" (ルーキー Rūkī) | "Boku to Hana" (2012) | 6:47 |
| 4. | "Mikazuki Sunset (FPM Everlust Mix)" (三日月サンセット, "Crescent Moon Sunset") | Remixion (2008) | 6:07 |
| 5. | "Light Dance YSST Remix 2015 (Remixed by Yoshinori Sunahara)" (ライトダンス Raito Dansu) | | 4:14 |
| 6. | "Eiga (Aoki Takamasa Remix)" | "Good-Bye" / "Eureka" (2014) | 5:02 |
| 7. | "Sample (Cosmic Version)" (サンプル Sanpuru) | Remixion (2008) | 8:14 |
| 8. | "Sayonara wa Emotion (Qrion Remix)" (さよならはエモーション, "Goodbyes Are Emotion") | | 3:57 |
| 9. | "Yes No (Aoki Takamasa Remix)" | "Identity" (2010) | 4:21 |
| 10. | "Yoru no Odoriko (Agraph Remix)" (夜の踊り子, "The Dancer of the Night") | | 5:51 |
| 11. | "Music (Cornelius Remix)" | "Sayonara wa Emotion" / "Hasu no Hana" (2014) | 5:46 |
| 12. | "Native Dancer (Rei Harakami Heppoko Re-Arrange)" (ネイティブダンサー(rei harakami へっぽこ re-arrange), "Rei Harakami's Amateur Re-Arrangement") | "Aruku Around" (2010) | 6:09 |
| Total length: | | | 55:13 |

DVD/Blu-ray disc: Tsuki no Keshiki
| No. | Title | Length |
|---|---|---|
| 1. | "Documentary of "Go to the Future (2006 Ver.)"" | 24:52 |
| 2. | "Go to the Future (2006 Ver.)" | 3:38 |
| 3. | "Years" | 4:23 |
| 4. | "Slow Motion" | 5:27 |
| 5. | "Holy Dance" | 5:23 |
| 6. | "Eureka (Minimal Demo)" (ユリイカ Yurīka) | 5:37 |
| Total length: | | 49:20 |

== Personnel ==
Personnel details were sourced from Natsukashii Tsuki wa Atarashii Tsuki: Coupling & Remix Works's liner notes booklet.

Sakanaction

- All members – arrangement (disc 1 #1–14, disc 2 #1–2), music (disc 1 #10, disc 2 #2), production (disc 1 #1–13, disc 2 #1–2)
- Keiichi Ejima – drums
- Motoharu Iwadera – guitar, arrangement (disc 1 #14)
- Ami Kusakari – bass guitar
- Emi Okazaki – keyboards
- Ichiro Yamaguchi – vocals, guitar, lyrics, music (disc 1 #1–9, #11–14, disc 2), arrangement (disc 1 #14)

Personnel and imagery

- Agraph – remixing (disc 2 #10)
- Aoki Takamasa – arrangement (disc 2 #2), production (disc 2 #2), mixing (disc 2 #2), musical support (disc 2 #1), remixing (disc 2 #6, #9)
- Cornelius – remixing (disc 2 #11)
- Daisuke Endo – A&R director
- FPM (Tomoyuki Tanaka) – remixing (disc 2 #4), post-production (disc 2 #4)
- Rei Harakami – re-arrangement (disc 2 #12)
- Takkyu Ishino – remixing (disc 2 #3)
- Minoru Iwabuchi – executive producer (Victor Entertainment)
- Ted Jensen – mastering (disc 1)
- Kamikene –art direction, designing
- Hayato Kumaki – manager (Hip Land Music Corporation)
- Kuniyuki – remixing (disc 2 #7)
- Toyoaki Mishima – recording, programming, mixing (disc 2 #11)
- Tatsuya Nomura – executive producer (Hip Land Music Corporation)
- Qrion – remixing (disc 2 #8)
- Masaki Sakamoto – post-mixing treatment (disc 2 #12)
- Kana Sekiguchi – manager (Hip Land Music Corporation)
- Yoshinori Sunahara – mastering (disc 2), remixing (disc 2 #5)
- Bin Tajima – executive producer (Hip Land Music Corporation)
- Ayaka Toki – recording, mixing (disc 2 #1)
- Yuzuru Tomita – post-production (disc 2 #4)
- Masashi Uramoto – recording, mixing (disc 1 #1–10, disc 2 #2)
- Takashi Watanabe – mixing (disc 2 #3–4)
- Daichi Yuhara – musical support and assistance (disc 2 #1–2)

== Charts ==
| Chart (2015) | Peak position |
|---|---|
| Japan Billboard Japan Hot Albums | 2 |
| Japan Oricon daily albums | 2 |
| Japan Oricon weekly albums | 5 |

=== Sales ===
| Chart | Amount |
|---|---|
| Oricon physical sales | 34,000 |

== Release history ==
| Region | Date | Format | Distributing Label | Catalogue codes |
|---|---|---|---|---|
| Japan | August 5, 2015 | 2CD, 2CD/DVD, 2CD/Blu-ray, digital download | Victor Entertainment | VICL-64337~8, VIZL-813, VIZL-814 |
| Japan | August 22, 2015 | rental CD | Victor Entertainment | VICL-64337~8 |
| South Korea | September 2, 2015 | digital download | J-Box Entertainment | —N/a |
| Taiwan | September 18, 2015 | CD | Rock Records | GUT2498.4 |
