= Word (Sakanaction song) =

- "Word" / "Sample" digital download cover

Single by Sakanaction

from the album Night Fishing
- Released: December 5, 2007
- Recorded: 2007
- Genre: Pop, dance, electronica, post-rock
- Length: 4:32
- Label: Victor Entertainment
- Songwriter: Ichiro Yamaguchi
- Producer: Sakanaction

Sakanaction singles chronology
"Word" / "Sample" (2007)	"Night Fishing Is Good" (2007)

"Word" (Japanese: ワード, Hepburn: Wādo) (Japanese pronunciation: [wa:do]) is a song by Japanese band Sakanaction. It was released on December 5, 2007 as a double A-side digital single alongside "Sample", two months before the band's second album Night Fishing. The song was inspired by frustration with the band's management during the Night Fishing writing sessions. The song received minor airplay in Hokkaido in January and February 2008, during the release of its parent album.

== Background and development ==
Sakanaction was first formed in 2005 in Sapporo, Hokkaido. The band gained exposure in Hokkaido after winning the audition to perform as a newcomer artist at the Rising Sun Rock Festival in Otaru in August 2006, and after demos of their songs "Mikazuki Sunset" and "Shiranami Top Water" performed well on College Radio Japan Sapporo. The band were signed to major label Victor Entertainment, and released their debut album Go to the Future on May 7, 2007, through Victor's BabeStar Label. The album was primarily promoted with the song "Mikazuki Sunset", which was widely promoted on radio stations in Hokkaido in May. On Go to the Future and Night Fishing, Sakanaction based themselves in Sapporo, and recorded their albums there.

Due to the response to the band's debut album Go to the Future, Sakanaction's A&R team pushed them to quickly follow this up with a second album. The majority of the songs present on the album were written specifically as an album, as opposed to the compilation-like nature of Go to the Future. The material for the album was created based on the response and criticism for their debut album, and the members realization that they should not be frightened to make bold changes.

== Writing and production ==
The song "Word" was inspired by the pressure the band's A&R team and musical director. The band's vocalist and songwriter Ichiro Yamaguchi found this frustrating, especially during a period of writer's block. In the original version of the song when Yamaguchi was composing it on the guitar, he began with the lyric kimi ga bokura o tameshiteru na (君が僕らを試してるな; "you are testing us"). This was later changed to yoru ga bokura o tameshiteru na (夜が僕らを試してるな; "the night is testing us") in the final version as he felt "you" was too strong a lyric. Yamaguchi created "Word" in response to "Atarashii Sekai" - a song that expressed optimistic feelings of wanting to travel, when he remembered walking with a girl beside a river at night. On "Word" he revisited these memories, instead applying a realistic lens to the event. He wanted to create a song that would make a person cry if they heard it on a winter's night, which was an idea he struggled to actualize until he was inspired by creating the lyric yoru ga bokura o tameshiteru na.

When the song was first performed in concert, the band originally gave the song the temporary title "Techno Word" (テクノワード, Tekuno Wādo), and was written as a song to give to former Judy and Mary vocalist Yuki, however plans did not come to fruition.

== Promotion and release ==
On December 5, the songs "Word" and "Sample" were released as a two-track single to iTunes. "Word" began to receive airplay in mid-January, peaking at number 41 on the Sapporo Hot 100 mixed airplay and sales chart. This, however, was dwarfed by the success of "Sample", which reached number five on the same chart. "Word" was used as the ending theme song for the NHK FM radio program Music Square. The song has been performed twice during Sakanaction's live tours: during the 2nd Album Tour 2008 Night Fishing Is Good tour, and once again during Sakanaquarium 2011 Zepp Alive. Neither performance has been released by the band digitally or on a video album.

== Music video ==
The music video for the song was directed by Hiroshi Kondō, which was recorded in a studio in Tokyo on December 25. Kondō had previously directed the video for Sakanaction's song "Shiranami Top Water" earlier in 2007. It features Yamaguchi by himself in a studio, singing and dancing to the song against a projected back-drop of sky and water images. During the song's bass solo, the video changes to show footage of the band performing a concert together.

== Critical reception ==
Atsushi Sasaki of Invitation thought highly of "Word"'s style, likening it to the works of Kenji Ozawa.

== Track listing ==
All tracks are written by Ichiro Yamaguchi.

"Word" / "Sample" digital download
No.	Title	Length
1.	"Word"	4:32
2.	"Sample" (サンプル Sanpuru)	4:41
Total length:		9:13

== Personnel ==
Personnel details were sourced from Night Fishing's liner notes booklet.

Sakanaction

- All members – arrangement, production
- Keiichi Ejima – drums
- Motoharu Iwadera – guitar
- Ami Kusakari – bass guitar
- Emi Okazaki – keyboards
- Ichiro Yamaguchi – vocals, guitar, songwriting

== Release history ==
Region	Date	Format	Distributing Label	Catalog codes
Japan	December 5, 2007	digital download	Victor Entertainment	VEAML-21941
