= 'Night Fishing Is Good' Tour 2008 in Sapporo =

EP by Sakanaction
- Released: August 6, 2008
- Recorded: March 8, 2008
- Genre: Techno, electronica, post-rock
- Length: 21:32
- Language: Japanese
- Label: BabeStar Label
- Producer: Sakanaction

Sakanaction chronology
Night Fishing (2008)	'Night Fishing Is Good' Tour 2008 in Sapporo (2008)	Remixion (2008)

'Night Fishing Is Good' Tour 2008 in Sapporo (stylized as 「NIGHT FISHING IS GOOD」TOUR 2008 in SAPPORO) is a live extended play by Japanese band Sakanaction. It was released on August 5, 2008 through Victor Entertainment sublabel BabeStar exclusively as a paid download.

== Background and production ==
Sakanaction was first formed in the summer of 2005 in Sapporo, Hokkaido, and released their debut album Go to the Future in May 2007. In the same month, the band performed a national tour to promote the album, including a solo-billed performance at Bessie Hall in Sapporo as the final performance, on May 27, 2007. For the rest of the year, the band worked on the production of their second album Night Fishing, which was released only half a year after their debut work, in January 2008.

The concert was recorded on March 8, 2008, at Penny Lane 24 in Sapporo. It was one of the either concerts held by Sakanaction in their Night Fishing Is Good tour, but only one of two dates that were a full-length, solo concert. The extended play compiles live takes of both of the promoted tracks on Go to the Future, "Mikazuki Sunset" and "Shiranami Top Water", as well as two of the three promotional tracks from Night Fishing, "Sample" and "Night Fishing Is Good".

== Release and reception ==
The extended play was first announced on July 24, 2008 at Sakanaction's official website. At the band's official MySpace page, footage of "Mikazuki Sunset" from the concert was uploaded. After its release on August 6, the extended play managed to top iTunes Japan's rock chart, surpassing Coldplay's Viva la Vida or Death and All His Friends. In December, Sakanaction released their first physical single release, "Sen to Rei". On the limited-edition version of the release, a recording of "Yoru no Higashigawa" from the same concert was added as a bonus track.

== Track listing ==
All tracks are written by Ichiro Yamaguchi.

'Night Fishing Is Good' Tour 2008 in Sapporo track listing
No.	Title	Length
1.	"Sample ('Night Fishing Is Good' Tour in Sapporo)" (サンプル Sanpuru)	5:06
2.	"Mikazuki Sunset ('Night Fishing Is Good' Tour in Sapporo)" (三日月サンセット, "Crescent Moon Sunset")	4:20
3.	"Night Fishing Is Good ('Night Fishing Is Good' Tour in Sapporo)" (ナイトフィッシングイズグッド Naito Fisshingu Izu Guddo)	6:30
4.	"Shiranami Top Water ('Night Fishing Is Good' Tour in Sapporo)" (白波トップウォーター, "White Wave Top Water")	5:36
Total length:		21:32

== Release history ==
Region	Date	Format	Distributing Label	Catalogue codes
Japan	August 6, 2008	digital download	BabeStar Label	VEAML-22450
