= Identity (Sakanaction song) =

- Physical editions and digital EP edition cover.

Single by Sakanaction

from the album Documentaly
- B-side: "Holy Dance"
- Released: July 7, 2010
- Recorded: 2010
- Genre: Pop, dance-rock, Latin, electro
- Length: 4:14
- Label: Victor Entertainment
- Songwriter: Ichiro Yamaguchi
- Producer: Sakanaction

Sakanaction singles chronology
"Aruku Around" (2010)	"Identity" (2010)	"Rookie" (2011)

"Identity" (Japanese: アイデンティティ, Hepburn: Aidentiti) (Japanese pronunciation: [aideꜜnti̥ti]) is a song by Japanese band Sakanaction. It was released in July and August 2010 as the band's first single after the release of their fourth album Kikuuiki in March 2010. The band's first summer-time release, "Identity" was an upbeat song featuring Latin percussion and lyrics about self-identity. In September 2011, it was added to the band's fifth studio album, Documentaly.

The song was well reviewed by Japanese music critics, who enjoyed the Latin percussive elements and the song's upbeat melody. Commercially, the song reached number twelve on Oricon's single chart and number seven on the Billboard Japan Hot 100, performing worse than the band's previous single "Aruku Around" (2010), but better than their earlier singles "Sen to Rei" (2008) and "Native Dancer" (2009).

== Background and development ==
After the release of their album Shin-shiro in early 2009, the band spent much of their time experimenting with different styles for their song "Aruku Around", testing the audience reaction to the song at summer festivals. After "Aruku Around" was released as a single in January 2010, it became a popular and critical success; reaching number three on Oricon's single charts, praised for its strong arrangement and band vocalist Ichiro Yamaguchi's poetic lyrics. After "Aruku Around", the band released their fourth studio album Kikuuiki in March 2010. Though the band had begun thinking of ideas for this record in February 2009, less than a month after their previous album, they recorded the bulk of the material in January and February 2010. "Identity" was a song that was born from the band's early demo sessions for Kikuuiki in 2009, during the same period when the band were experimenting on "Aruku Around" to create a signature song with a recognisable Sakanaction sound, and considering what a single's role was. After Kikuuiki, the band planned to release an "easy to digest" song in a similar vein to "Aruku Around".

To promote Kikuuiki, the band performed a thirteen-date national tour of Japan in April and May, Sakanaquarium 2010 Kikuuiki. At the tour final on May 28 at Zepp Tokyo, the band performed "Identity" for the first time during the concert's encore. On the same day, the song was announced as the band's next single, scheduled for release in August.

== Writing and inspiration ==
The song was conceived in 2009, as the band's next work after the song "Me ga Aku Aiiro" (2010), the leading track from Kikuuiki. "Me ga Aku Aiiro", a complicated seven-minute rock opera, had been the final song that the band worked on for Kikuuiki, with recording sessions lasting until February 16, a month before the album's release. After the success of Kikuuiki, they felt that the time was opportune for the band to quickly release new material. This time also coincided with the time when band members began to smoothly and enjoyably record music together, compared to the band's earlier albums, such as Night Fishing (2008), where the process was difficult and frustrating. After the band's success with "Aruku Around" and Kikuuiki, "Identity" was the first song the band wrote specifically for a wider audience.

The song's lyrics were directly inspired by "Me ga Aku Aiiro", which were written after "Me ga Aku Aiiro" had been completed. For "Me ga Aku Aiiro", Yamaguchi felt that he needed to develop a new style of lyric writing for himself, featuring abstract concepts but words that people would still empathise with. The first part of the song was inspired by an incident where Yamaguchi was watching people carry out their daily lives. He noticed that almost all of the women around him were wearing leggings, which made him hyper-sensitive to each person's individuality. This feeling, which had been unconscious for him before, inspired the song's chorus lyric identity ga nai, umarenai (アイデンティティがない 生まれない; "I have no identity, it's not born") and melody. The rest of the lyrics were inspired by YouTube comments, which Yamaguchi noticed were often further comments of already existing comments, instead of a comment about their first impressions of the video. This made him realise that people often base their identities on the actions of other people. After considering the idea, Yamaguchi considered the only time people were free from these outside influences were in early childhood, where people's actions were expressing their pure self-identity, and wanted to express his conclusion in the lyrics of "Identity". The song's final lyrics were written by Yamaguchi in three perspectives: the perspective of someone on stage, an audience member perspective and a third perspective encompassing both aspects.

The song was given the concept of a Sakanaction version of Southern All Stars' 1978 song "Katte ni Sinbad" when writing. While Yamaguchi said this as a joke, he felt that this was true for where the band were in their career (like Southern All Stars, who were able to produce many high response singles after "Katte ni Sinbad", such as "Itoshi no Ellie" (1979)). As the song was the band's first summer release, the band members wanted a melody that would express this. Together, they felt that adding conga drums would add to the summer atmosphere of the song. In the band's previous album, Kikuuiki, where the band had attempted to 'mix the unmixable'. "Identity" was an extension of this, where they mixed "heavy" lyrics with a "fun" backing track. The song's sound was an experiment for the band as they considered what pop music was, when previously they had thought of their music in terms of rock. Instead of a pop sound that merely colored the band, Sakanaction wanted to create pop music with a Sakanaction approach. If they were not able to do this, Yamaguchi felt that the band would become trapped; only accessible to a small field of music fans. Because of this, Yamaguchi considers "Identity" to be a song that showed off a new aspect of Sakanaction, similar to their songs "Sen to Rei" (2008) and "Aruku Around" (2010).

== Composition ==
"Identity"
A sample of the chorus of the electro/rock song "Identity", which critics praised for its incorporation of Latin-inspired beats.

"Identity" is an up-tempo song with a strong Latin beat, blending together Latin, rock and electro genres. The song's chorus features a vocal chorus of ten people singing in the background. The song's lyrics question the nature of what self-identity is, and strongly contrast with the song's otherwise happy and upbeat sound.

The song's lyrics feature the phrase identity ga nai, umarenai, which leads the song and feature in the song's chorus. The song's protagonist says that going by measures such as what his favourite clothes, books and food are, he's just a regular person, and that him thinking about the morning's rain that led to a woman's shirt becoming set were inelegant thoughts. A scene is depicted in the lyrics where someone at the beginning of a concert compares himself with the other members of the audience, and realises that comparing yourself to others is not a proper way to live. Later, he thinks about childhood memories of defeat, and realises that these memories are his pure self. After understanding this, he feels like he wants to scream, and begins to cry.

== Promotion and release ==
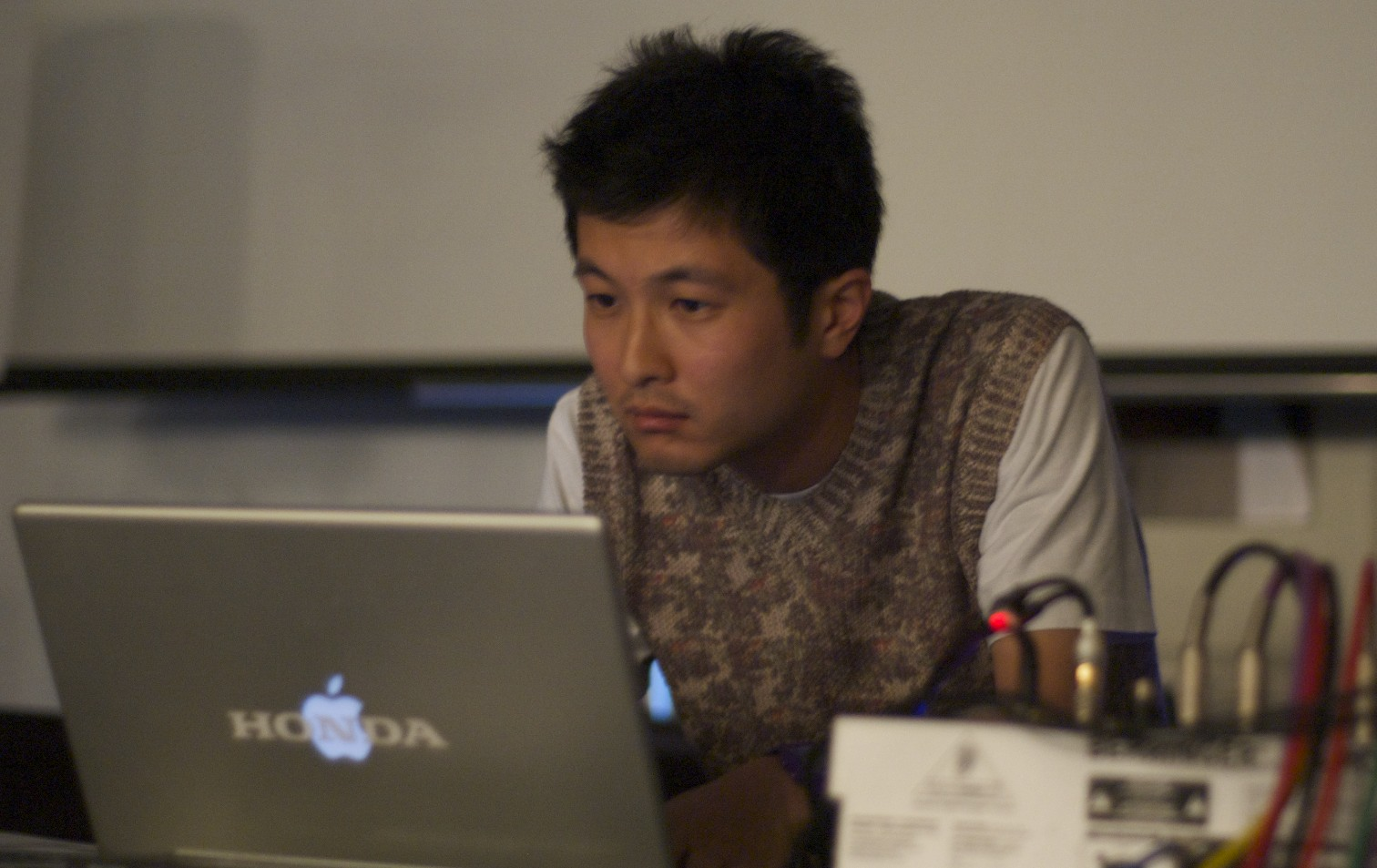
Japanese electronic musician Aoki Takamasa remixed the band's song "Yes No" for the single.

The song was used in commercials for the yobikō Toshin High School from the start of August 2010, and in September 2011 was added to the playable song list of the Konami arcade game Jubeat Copious. In 2013, the song became the theme song for the film Judge!, starring Satoshi Tsumabuki and Keiko Kitagawa. Sakanaction produced an original song for the film's ending credits, "Eureka", which was released as a single in 2013.

The single was released digitally exclusive to iTunes on July 7, followed by a wide and physical release on August 4. The single was released in two physical versions, CD only and CD/DVD. The DVD edition featured a recording of five songs taken from the band's performance at Shinkiba Studio Coast on May 15, 2010. Yamaguchi and the other band members wanted to add the DVD to the single, as they felt that "Identity" was single made primarily to introduce people to Sakanaction, so felt that a DVD showcase of their most recent concert was appropriate. The concert was later released in full as the Sakanaquarium 2010(C) DVD on February 2, 2011. The first press edition of the physical single came with additional photos of the band during recording sessions and concert performances, and a serial number to apply to attend the band's Sakanaquarium 21.1(B) concert at the Nippon Budokan, held on October 8, 2010. The single featured two additional tracks, the B-side "Holy Dance" and a remix of "Yes No" from Kikuuiki created by Aoki Takamasa. Conceptually, Yamaguchi thought of the single as a piece of fruit, with "Identity" acting as the skin, "Holy Dance" the flesh and "Yes No (Aoki Takamasa Remix)" the pit.

In August 2015, a new version of the song produced by Emi Kusakari called "Identity (Ks_Remix)" was released on the band's compilation album Natsukashii Tsuki wa Atarashii Tsuki: Coupling & Remix Works. The album also compiled the single's B-sides "Holy Dance" and "Yes No (Aoki Takamasa Remix)", and a music video was created for "Holy Dance", directed by Yamaguchi personally. On March 3, 2016, Kanna Hashimoto of the girl group Rev. from DVL sang a cover of the song at an event to promote the film Sailor Suit and Machine Gun: Graduation (2016), which she decided to perform because she believed the song's lyrical theme of self-identity matched her experience of the film.

Since its release, the song has become a staple of the band's concert set-lists. Five recordings of performances of the song have been released. The first was at the band's performance at the Nippon Budokan on October 8, 2010, was released as Sakanaquarium (B). The song features on the band's following video albums, Sakanaquarium 2011 Documentaly: Live at Makuhari Messe, Sakanaquarium 2013 Sakanaction: Live at Makuhari Messe 2013.5.19, and Sakanatribe 2014: Live at Tokyo Dome City Hall. It also makes an appearance on their digitally exclusive live album Sakanaquarium 2012 "Zepp Alive" (2012).

== Cover artwork ==
The cover artwork is an actualisation of the song's message of questioning the nature of self-identity. It features a question mark design created by stacked copies of Sakanaction's previously released CDs, created by designer Kamikene of Hatos. The iTunes Store edition of the single featured an alternate take of the artwork, seen from a different angle.

== Music video ==
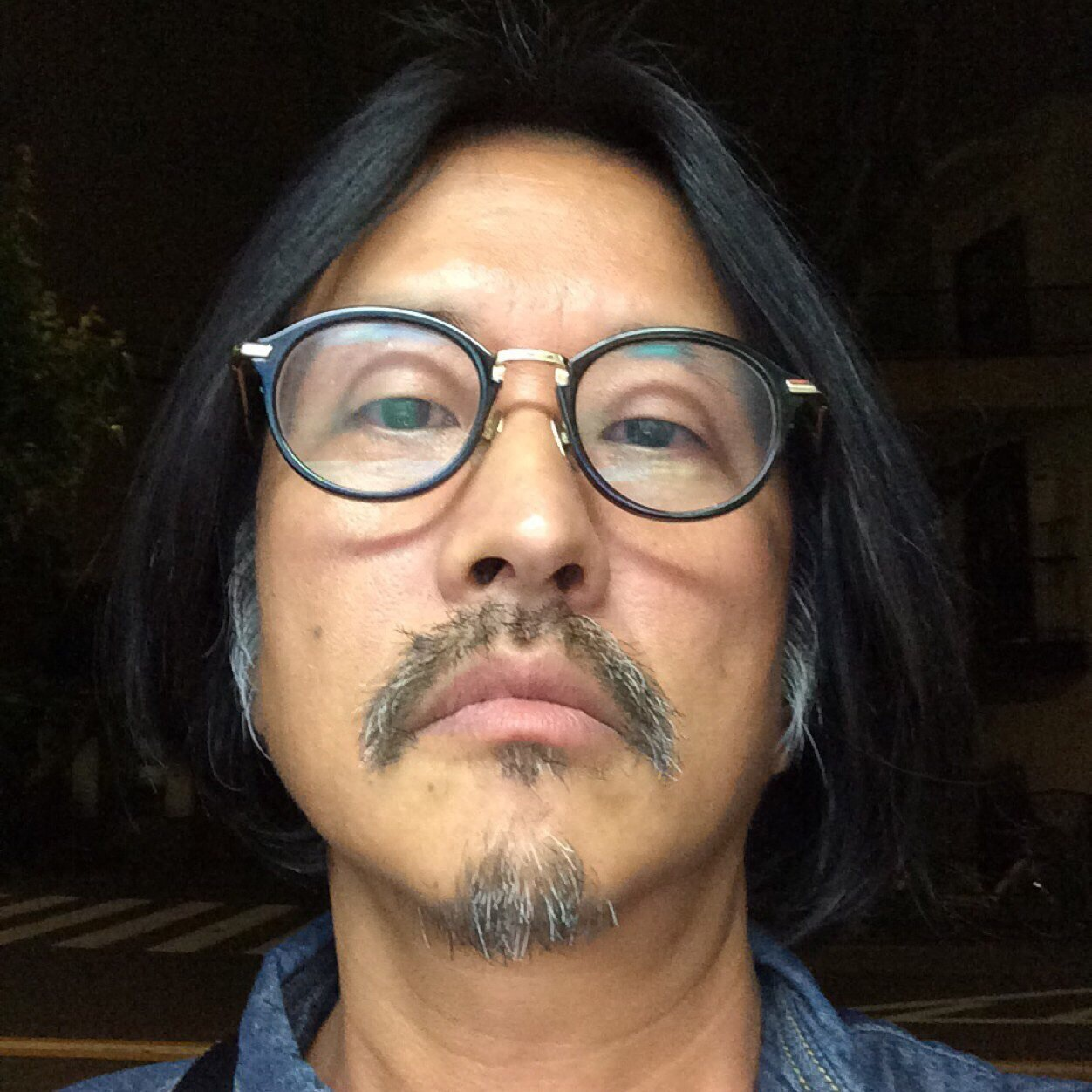
Stylist Hisashi "Momo" Kitazawa, who had worked with the band since 2008, directed the music video.

The music video was directed by Hisashi "Momo" Kitazawa. Kitazawa had worked as the band's stylist since the release of their song "Sen to Rei" (2008), however had never worked as a music video director before. Kitazawa was asked to direct the music video during meetings discussing the music video project, when generally Kitazawa was the person who contacted directors to work on the band's video projects. After worrying about the idea for two days, Kitazawa accepted the offer. The band shot the music video on June 25, 2010.

The video features scenes of the band performing the song in a dark room, back-lit with a series of fluorescent tubes. The members wear black and white clothing, and in other scenes are shown individually against a background of black and white patterns. In the latter half of the video, the camera slowly pans out, revealing that the video is actually being broadcast from the screen of a pachinko machine.

Kitazawa gave the video a pachinko machine motif, and aimed to create an entirely different image from the band's previous artistic videos. Kitazawa was inspired by pachinko machines, strongly associated with a "dirty mood" as they are gambling devices, however when seen outside of context are innocent game cabinets. Kitazawa felt that how the identity of what a pachinko machine is changes depending on the conceptions of people, and that this expressed the messages of the song well. Kitazawa was inspired by the chorus lyric identity ga nai to create a video primarily in grey sale, and focused much of the video on light and shadow. The Kino Flo fluorescent tubes used on the band performance scenes of the video were made to resemble fish bones, relating to the meaning of the band's name in Japanese.

The video was first released on July 10, where it was exclusively shown on the Space Shower program Jet until July 18, before being released to other music video networks. The video was uploaded to YouTube on July 10, and as of August 2015 has amassed more than 14 million views.

== Reception ==
=== Critical reception ===
CDJournal reviewers gave the single their star of approval, calling it the "highest [level of] pop music" and a future anthem for Sakanaction. They praised the "radical but considered electro sound" and the "dancable" four on the floor beat, also describing the Latin percussion was "fresh". The reviewers felt that the song's melody was so high quality that it would sound good even backed with just a guitar. They praised Yamaguchi's "unique" lyrical sense, as well as Yamaguchi's vocals at the start of the chorus as he sang the word dōshite, feeling it was "intense".

Yuichi Hirayama of Excite described the song as "a radical pop tune that rides on tribal dance beats, while questioning the nature of identity", while Sumire Hanatsuka of Skream! similarly felt that the song blended a Latin rhythm with the "spirits of a Japanese festival". Tetsuo Hiraga of Hot Express described the song as "a flood of sound, an emotional explosion, a pleasurable Latin beat, and a melody and lyrics that make you want to scream.", also praising the song's high impact, feeling that it would resonate well even with casual music listeners.

=== Commercial reception ===
The single debuted at number 12 on Oricon's physical singles chart, selling 12,000 copies. Rival sales tracking agency SoundScan Japan found that the vast majority of copies sold in the first week were of the single's limited CD/DVD edition. After spending a total of eight weeks in the top 200 singles, "Identity" managed to sell a total of 21,000 copies.

== Track listings ==
Digital download
No.	Title	Length
1.	"Identity"	4:14
Total length:		4:14

All tracks are written by Ichiro Yamaguchi.

Physical single, digital EP
No.	Title	Length
1.	"Identity"	4:14
2.	"Holy Dance" (ホーリーダンス Hōrī Dansu)	5:17
3.	"Yes No (Aoki Takamasa Remix)"	4:21
Total length:		13:52

DVD: Sakanaquarium 2010 Kikuuiki: 5.15.Shinkiba Coast
No.	Title	Length
1.	"21.1"
2.	"Ashita kara" (明日から, "From Tomorrow")
3.	"Klee"
4.	"Paradise of Sunny"
5.	"Aruku Around" (アルクアラウンド, "Walk Around")

== Personnel ==
Personnel details were sourced from Documentaly's liner notes booklet. Music video personnel details were sourced from Sakanarchive 2007—2011: Sakanaction Music Video Collection.

Sakanaction

- All members – arrangement, production
- Keiichi Ejima – drums
- Motoharu Iwadera – guitar
- Ami Kusakari – bass guitar
- Emi Okazaki – keyboards
- Ichiro Yamaguchi – vocals, guitar, lyrics, composition

Personnel

- Minoru Iwabuchi – executive producer (Victor Entertainment)
- Hayato Kumaki – manager
- Kensuke Maeda – assistant engineer for Alive Recording Studio
- Satoshi Tajima – executive producer (Hip Land Music Corporation)
- Masashi Uramoto – mixing, recording
- Naoki Yokota – executive producer (Victor Entertainment)

Music video personnel

- Takeshi Hanzawa – cameraman
- Hisashi "Momo" Kitazawa – director, stylist
- Masanori Kobayashi – production design
- Masaki Shinozuka – producer
- Yasuyuki Suzuki – lighting
- Eisuke Takahashi – graphic editing
- Taku – hair, make-up
- Tongfarr – production company

== Charts ==
Chart (2010)	Peak position
Japan Billboard Adult Contemporary Airplay	5
Japan Billboard Japan Hot 100	7
Japan Oricon daily singles	9
Japan Oricon weekly singles	12

== Certifications and sales ==
Region	Certification	Certified units/sales
Japan (Oricon) Physical	—	21,000
Japan (RIAJ) Digital	Platinum	250,000^{*}
Streaming
Japan (RIAJ)	Platinum	100,000,000^{†}
^{*} Sales figures based on certification alone.^{†} Streaming-only figures based on certification alone.

== Release history ==
Region	Date	Format	Distributing Label	Catalog codes
Japan	June 30, 2010	ringtone, radio debut	Victor Entertainment	—N/a
Japan	July 7, 2010	PC digital download	Victor Entertainment	—N/a
Japan	July 21, 2010	cellphone digital download	Victor Entertainment	—N/a
Japan	August 4, 2010	CD single, CD/DVD single	Victor Entertainment	VICL-36603, VIZL-386
South Korea	August 18, 2010	digital download	J-Box Entertainment	—N/a
Japan	August 21, 2010	rental CD single	Victor Entertainment	VICL-36603
