= Sekaiichi =

2000s Japanese rock band

Sekaiichi (セカイイチ)
- Origin: Japan
- Genres: Rock
- Years active: 2001–2023
- Labels: Toy's Factory (2005-); Tearbridge Records (2010-2013); Anaheim Records (2014-2023)
- Past members: Iwasaki Kei; Nakauti Masayuki; Izumi Kentarou; Yoshizawa Kyou
- Website: www.sekaiichi.jp

Sekaiichi (セカイイチ) is a four-piece Japanese rock band which started in 2001. They signed to Toy's Factory in 2005, but changed labels to Tearbridge Records/Avex in 2010. Their first mini album was released in 2003 and they also played their first live performance the same year. The band announced their indefinite hiatus on 16 January, 2023.

== Band members ==
- Kei Iwasaki (岩崎 慧, Iwasaki Kei)
  - Vocalist, guitarist
  - Birthdate: 8 July 1982
  - Hometown: Osaka
- Masayuki Nakauchi (中内 正之, Nakauchi Masayuki)
  - Guitarist
  - Birthdate: 13 February 1981
  - Hometown: Fukui Prefecture
- Kentarō Izumi (泉 健太郎, Izumi Kentarō)
  - Bassist
  - Birthdate: 12 November 1977
  - Hometown: Osaka
- Kyō Yoshizawa (吉澤 響, Yoshizawa Kyō)
  - Drummer
  - Birthdate: 19 May 1978
  - Hometown: Nara Prefecture

== Discography ==
=== Albums ===
==== Indie ====
1. Kyō Ano Hashi no Mukou Made (今日あの橋の向こうまで)
  - Release Date: 26 January 2005 (Re-release)/ 10 December 2003 (Tokiola Records)
  - Track List:
    1. Kiitemasu ka Otsukisama? (聞いてますか お月様?)
    2. Hazunamono (はずなもの)
    3. Mikazuki (三日月)
    4. Shinzūriki (神通力)
    5. Silk Hat (シルクハット)
    6. Cider (さいだー)
    7. Kyō Ano Hashi no Mukō made (今日あの橋の向こうまで)

==== Major ====
1. Awai Aka to Kirei na Ao (淡い赤ときれいな青と)
  - Release Date: 25 May 2005
  - Track List:
    1. Yūkei (夕景)
    2. Ame no bori (雨のぼり)
    3. Ishi kurobu (石コロブ)
    4. Dorekurai no Yoru (どれくらいの夜)
    5. Folk (フォーク)
    6. Pool (プール)
    7. I no Naka no Sekai (井の中の世界)
    8. Utsukushiki Tooboe (美しき遠吠え)
    9. Furitashi no Uta (ふりだしの歌)
    10. Misora (ミソラ)
2. Art in the Earth
  - Release Date: 28 June 2006
  - Track List:
    1. Doll (ドール)
    2. Ukraine (ウクライナ)
    3. Asa to Yoru (朝と夜)
    4. Natsu no Owari, (夏の終わり、)
    5. Capsule (カプセル)
    6. Jōshō Kiryū (上昇気流)
    7. Kotoba (言葉)
    8. Necromancer (ネクロマンサー)
    9. Lightning Style (ライトニングスタイル)
    10. Niji (虹)
    11. Bokura no Uta (僕らの歌)
3. Sekai de Ichiban Kirai na Koto (世界で一番嫌いなこと)
  - Release Date: 21 November 2007
  - Track List:
  1. Yūki no Hana (勇気の花)
  2. Saigishin (さいぎしん)
  3. Binetsu Shōnen (微熱少年)
  4. Monaka (モナカ)
  5. Rain/That/Something
  6. 118
  7. Schneider (シュナイダー)
  8. Me and My Love
  9. Antenna (アンテナ)
  10. Kūchū Buranko (空中ブランコ)
4. Sekaiichi (セカイイチ)
  - Release Date: 25 February 2009
  - Track List:
    1. New Pop Song Order
    2. Aikotoba (合言葉)
    3. Atarimae no Sora (あたりまえの空)
    4. You Gotta Love
    5. Last Waltz
    6. Interlude
    7. Akari (あかり)
    8. Amai Jōnetsu (甘い情熱)
    9. Jaipur Town
    10. Oil Shock
    11. Buriki no Tsuki (ブリキの月)
    12. Present (ぷれぜんと)
    13. Subarashii Sekai (素晴らしい世界)

=== Singles ===
1. Furidashi no Uta (ふりだしの歌)
  - Release date: 28 April 2004/26 January 2005
  - Track list:
    1. Furidashi no Uta (ふりだしの歌)
    2. Kaerimichi (帰り道)
    3. Misora (ミイラ)
2. Ishi Korobu (石コロブ)
  - Release date: 6 April 2005
  - Track list:
  1. Ishi Korobu (石コロブ)
  2. Tawakoto Nikki (たわごと日記)
  3. Yubikiri (ゆびきり)
3. Niji (虹)
  - Release date: 2 November 2005
  - Track list:
  1. Niji (虹)
  2. Wasureta Koto (忘れてた事)
4. In the Art
  - Release date: 24 May 2006
  - Track list:
  1. Capsule (カプセル)
  2. Lightning Style (ライトニングスタイル)
  3. Shirube (しるべ)
5. Rain/That/Something
  - Release date: 27 June 2007
  - Track list:
  1. Rain/That/Something
  2. Kanashii Kotoba (悲しいことば)
6. Akari (あかり)
  - Release date: 22 October 2008
  - Track list:
  1. Akari (あかり)
  2. Tegami (手紙)
  3. Kūchū Buranko (空中ブランコ) (Studio acoustic track)
7. Step On
  - Release date: 3 November 2010
  - Track list:
  1. Step On
  2. Grace Kelly (グレース・ケリー)
  3. Bench (ベンチ)
  4. Sainō to Kaihō (才能と解放)

=== DVD ===
1. Top Of The Clips
  - Release date: 16 September 2009
  - The live clip portion of the DVD was recorded at Daikanyama Unit on 17 May 2009 on the "Top Of The Clips Tour".
  - Track list:
    - Clips:
      1. Silk Hat (シルクハット)
      2. Furidashi no Uta (ふりだしの歌)
      3. Ishi Korobu (石コロブ)
      4. Ame no Bori (雨のぼり)
      5. Niji (虹)
      6. Bokura no Uta (僕らの歌)
      7. Capsule (カプセル)
      8. Rain / That / Something
      9. Yūki no Hana (勇気の花)
      10. Atari (あかり)
      11. Buriki no Tsuki (ブリキの月)
      12. Present (ぷれぜんと)
    - Live:
      1. New Pop Song Order
      2. Jaipur Town
      3. Atarimae no Sora (あたりまえの空)
      4. Last Waltz
      5. Amai Jōnetsu (甘い情熱)
      6. You Gotta Love
      7. Present (ぷれぜんと)
      8. Buriki no Tsuki (ブリキの月)
      9. Aikotoba (合言葉)
      10. Oil Shock
      11. I no Naka no Sekai (井の中の世界)
      12. Rain / That / Something
      13. Atari (あかり)
      14. Subarashii Sekai (素晴らしい世界)
      15. Kiitemasu ka Otsukisama? (聞いてますか お月様？)

=== Others ===
- Download
  - Present (ぷれぜんと)
  - Release date: 14 November 2008
  - Track list:
    1. Present (ぷれぜんと)
