= Arata River =

Coordinates: 35°22′26″N 136°41′56″E

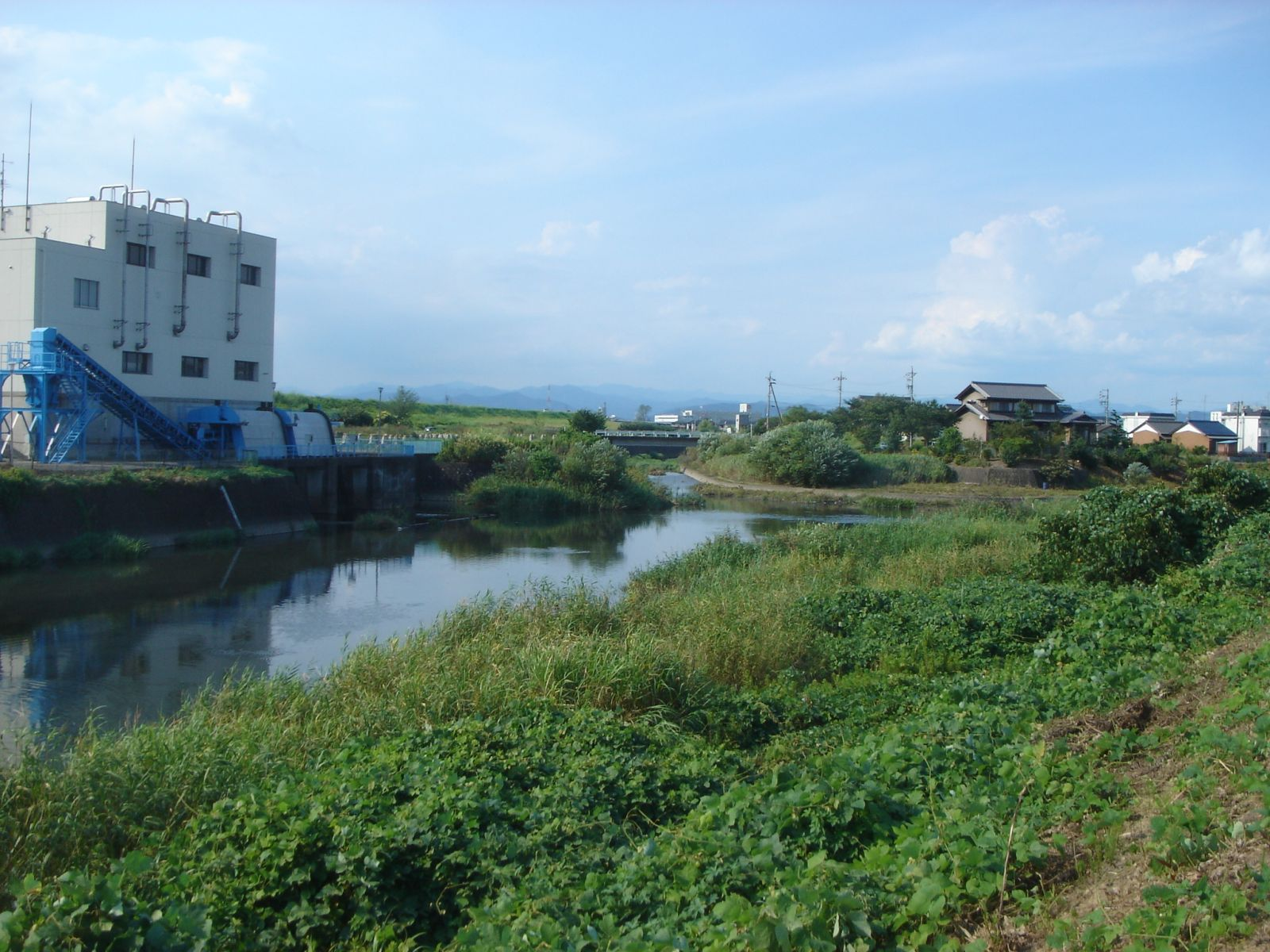

- Native name: 荒田川 (Japanese)

Location
- Country: Japan

Physical characteristics
- Source
  - location: Gifu
- Mouth
  - location: Nagara River
- Length: 10.2 km (6.3 mi)
- Basin size: 22.1 km^{2} (8.5 sq mi)

Basin features
- River system: Kiso River

The Arata River (荒田川, Arata-gawa) is a river in Japan which flows through the city of Gifu, Gifu Prefecture. It originates in the eastern part of the city and flows westward before joining with the Nagara River. It is part of the Kiso River system. (The Sakai River also flows close to the Arata River and two rivers have small canals connecting the two in places.)
