= Night Fishing (album) =

Studio album by Sakanaction
- Released: January 23, 2008
- Recorded: 2007
- Genre: Pop, dance, electronica, post-rock
- Length: 49:51
- Language: Japanese
- Label: BabeStar Label
- Producer: Sakanaction

Sakanaction chronology
Go to the Future (2007)	Night Fishing (2008)	'Night Fishing Is Good' Tour 2008 in Sapporo (2008)

Singles from Night Fishing
- 1. "Word" Released: December 5, 2007; 2. "Sample" Released: December 5, 2007; 3. "Night Fishing Is Good" Released: December 26, 2007

Night Fishing (stylized as NIGHT FISHING, Japanese pronunciation: [naitoɸiꜜɕɕiŋɡɯ]) is the second studio album by Japanese band Sakanaction. It was released on January 23, 2008, through Victor Entertainment's BabeStar Label. The album primarily features music written by vocalist Ichiro Yamaguchi since the release of their debut album Go to the Future (2007). Compared to their debut album, which compiled songs that the band had already written, the majority of the songs on Night Fishing were written specifically for the release. The album was an attempt by the band to find a better balance between popular music and underground, and was an album where the members wanted to incorporate more of their own personal styles; which caused the members to disagree over its content much more than on their debut album.

The album was preceded by the digital singles "Word", "Sample" and "Night Fishing Is Good", all released in December 2007. Out of these, "Sample" was chosen as the main promotional track for the album, receiving high radio play in Hokkaido. Critically, the band was praised for their new direction on Night Fishing, with critics praising the album's mix of pop and electronic musical elements, Yamaguchi's poetic lyrics and "transparent" vocals. Night Fishing was more commercially successful than Go to the Future, reaching number 53 on the Oricon singles chart.

In 2009, the album was made available globally as a digital download, alongside the band's debut and third albums Go to the Future (2007) and Shin-shiro (2009). In 2015, the album was reissued on CD, LP record and lossless digital formats.

== Background and development ==
Sakanaction was first formed in 2005 in Sapporo, Hokkaido. The band gained exposure in Hokkaido after winning the audition to perform as a newcomer artist at the Rising Sun Rock Festival in Otaru in August 2006, and after demos of their songs "Mikazuki Sunset" and "Shiranami Top Water" performed well on College Radio Japan Sapporo. The band were signed to major label Victor Entertainment, and released their debut album Go to the Future on May 7, 2007, through Victor's BabeStar Label. The group performed a short tour of Japan to promote the album's release, performing concerts in Tokyo, Osaka, Nagoya and Sapporo in May. As a part of the Sapporo concert's set-list, the band performed the songs "Teenage" and "Amsfish"; then unpublished songs that would later be added to Night Fishing. Since their debut, the band had been based in Sapporo, and had recorded their albums there. Night Fishing would become their last Hokkaido-based release, as the group moved to Tokyo in mid 2008.

Due to the response to the band's debut album Go to the Future, Sakanaction's A&R team pushed them to quickly follow this up with a second album. They felt extremely pressured while creating the album, especially by their musical director at Victor Entertainment.

== Writing and production ==
=== Conception ===
Most of the songs featured on Night Fishing were written specifically for it. The band members felt like the album was their first release that they had made together as a five-member band, as opposed to Go to the Future, which the band's vocalist and songwriter Ichiro Yamaguchi described as feeling like a "business card" due to the inclusion of mostly old material. The material for the album was created based on the response and criticism for their debut album, and the members realization that they should not be frightened to make bold changes. However, several songs were already written beforehand: "Sample" was originally a song released by Yamaguchi's high school band Dutchman 2002, and "Amsfish" was a song written during Sakanaction's early days in 2005 that did not make the album cut of Go to the Future, because Yamaguchi felt that the song did not fit well on their debut release. The band attempted to make a more commercial sound compared to Go to the Future, and tried to strike a balance between underground, minimal electronic music and "high entertainment" popular music. The band wanted to keep a sense of enjoyment in their music, and attempted to do so by experimenting with different musical styles, including progressive rock and choral singing, and experimenting with elements of ambient and folk music. After performing their first Japanese tour in 2008, Sakanaction put more consideration into choosing arrangements that would work better at live concerts.

The album was created at a point where each of the band members wanted to incorporate more of their own personalities into the music of Sakanaction, which led to Night Fishing becoming the album where the members disagreed over its content the most. Sakanaction also had difficulty between themselves and their record label over deciding which song should have been the leading promotional song. The label had chosen "Sample", but there was a lot of opposition to this from Yamaguchi, who preferred "Night Fishing Is Good". When the band unveiled their song to their director at Studio Milk, he did not react very well to the song, and the label chose not to promote this song due to its six-minute length. During this time, Yamaguchi had begun to realize the power of music videos after the rise in popularity of video-sharing websites such as YouTube, so decided to make his own low-budget video for the song; describing "Night Fishing Is Good" as the underground leading promotional song for the album.

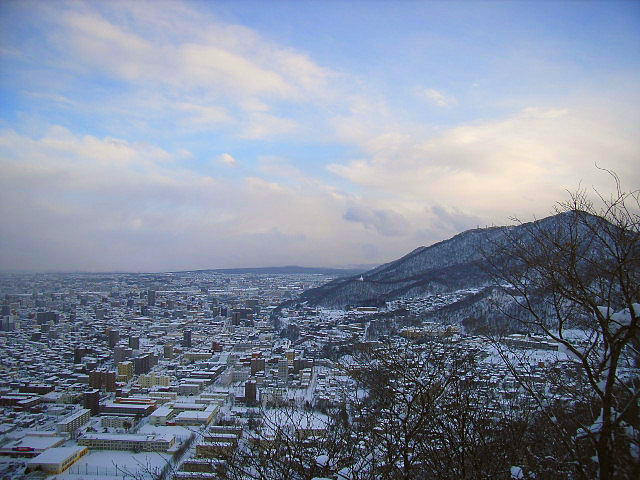
The album was entirely recorded at Discovery Studio in the Maruyama Nishi-machi area (pictured) of Sapporo, Hokkaido.

Demo recording sessions for Night Fishing began several days before the release of the band's debut album Go to the Future in May 2007. The band members formally proposed the album concepts to Victor Entertainment staff in June 2007. The album's official studio recording sessions began in September 2007 and concluded in October, and were entirely undertaken at Discovery Studio in the Maruyama Nishi-machi area of Chūō-ku, Sapporo. After the album sessions had finished, however, the band immediately kept on recording for their future projects. The album's track order was not considered until the very final mastering stages of the album. Yamaguchi did much of the album's final mixing himself personally.

Several of the band's plans for the album did not come into fruition. Originally the band had planned for "Ame wa Kimagure" to be the leading song on the album, but after producing the song, Yamaguchi felt that the song's arrangement was too stylized and not easily accessible. The band had wanted to shoot a video for "Atarashii Sekai" on location in Kyoto, however they abandoned plans for this.

=== Song inspiration and production ===
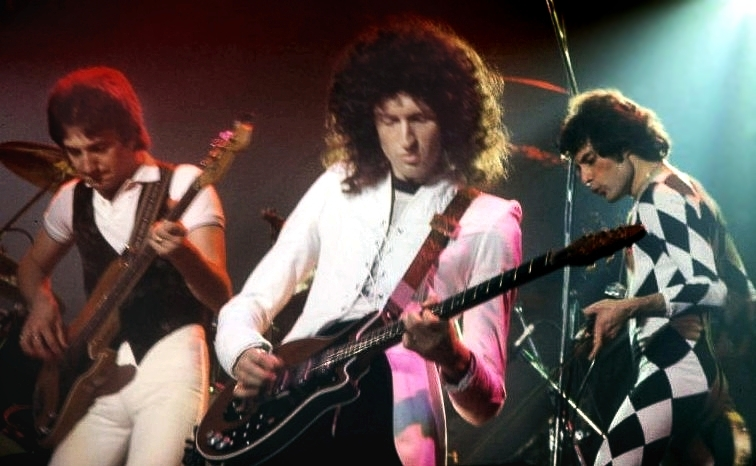
The arrangement for the song "Night Fishing Is Good" was partially inspired by English rock band Queen.

Lyrically, Yamaguchi worked around a "night" theme, and was inspired by creating film-like imagery for each song. Yamaguchi wanted to compile lyrics featuring introspective feelings of worry and sadness that people primarily felt at night. Yamaguchi was further inspired to write more autobiographically, creating a documentary-like non-fiction work. He wanted to create lyrics closer to the style of haiku than standard pop lyricism, in order to express many things with as few phrases as possible.

Despite the album's track order not being decided until the very end, Yamaguchi had thought from the start that "Ame wa Kimagure", "Malaysia 32" and "Uneri" should be in that order. After plans for "Ame wa Kimagure" to become the leading song were scrapped, Yamaguchi decided to elaborate on the "oriental" feel of the song. "Malaysia 32" is the band's first instrumental song, and was based on a synthesizer riff made by the band's guitarist Motoharu Iwadera which was then completed with ideas from everyone in the band. The song was called "Malaysia" because of how at one point they added a vocal melody that sounded like the name of the city Kuala Lumpur. The number 32 in the title is a reference to the fact that the song is based on a synthesizer loop of 32 bars. Originally "Uneri" had been envisioned as a rock song, but the band decided against this after creating "Night Fishing Is Good". The band's musical director suggested that they perform the song acoustically instead, which led to the final studio arrangement of "Uneri".

"Night Fishing Is Good" was inspired by the style of musical theatre and classical music. Originally the other band members were hesitant about the song when Yamaguchi first played it to them, and they suggested that they split the piece into two compositions. During the song's recording, Yamaguchi felt that the song would benefit from having a similar style to the English rock band Queen, which the band's pianist Emi Okazaki in particular responded well to. Iwadera added Queen-style guitar riffs to the song, and the group decided to add a vocal chorus, in the style of a Queen song. Only after "Night Fishing Is Good" had been finished did the band decide to title the album after this song.

== Promotion and release ==
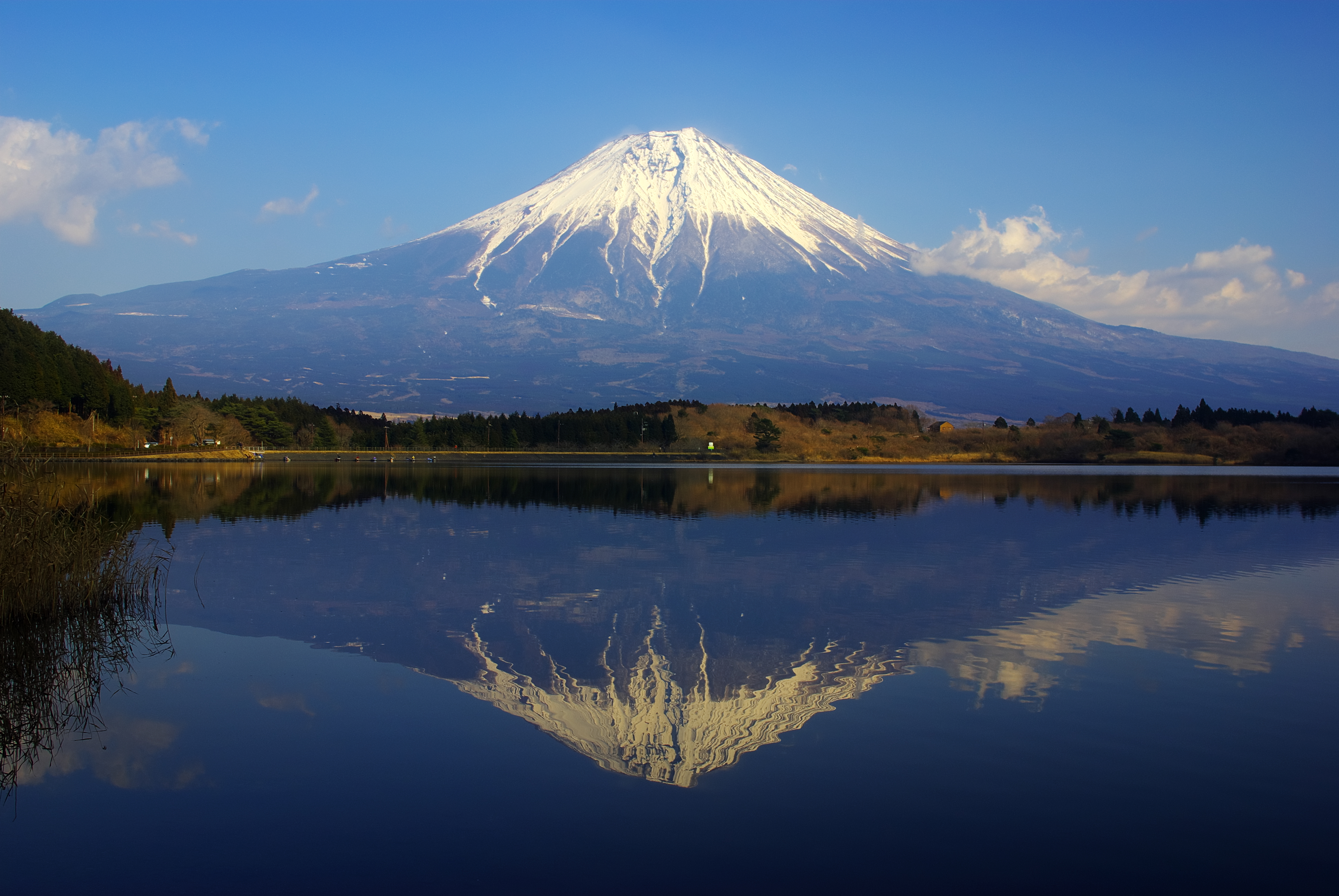
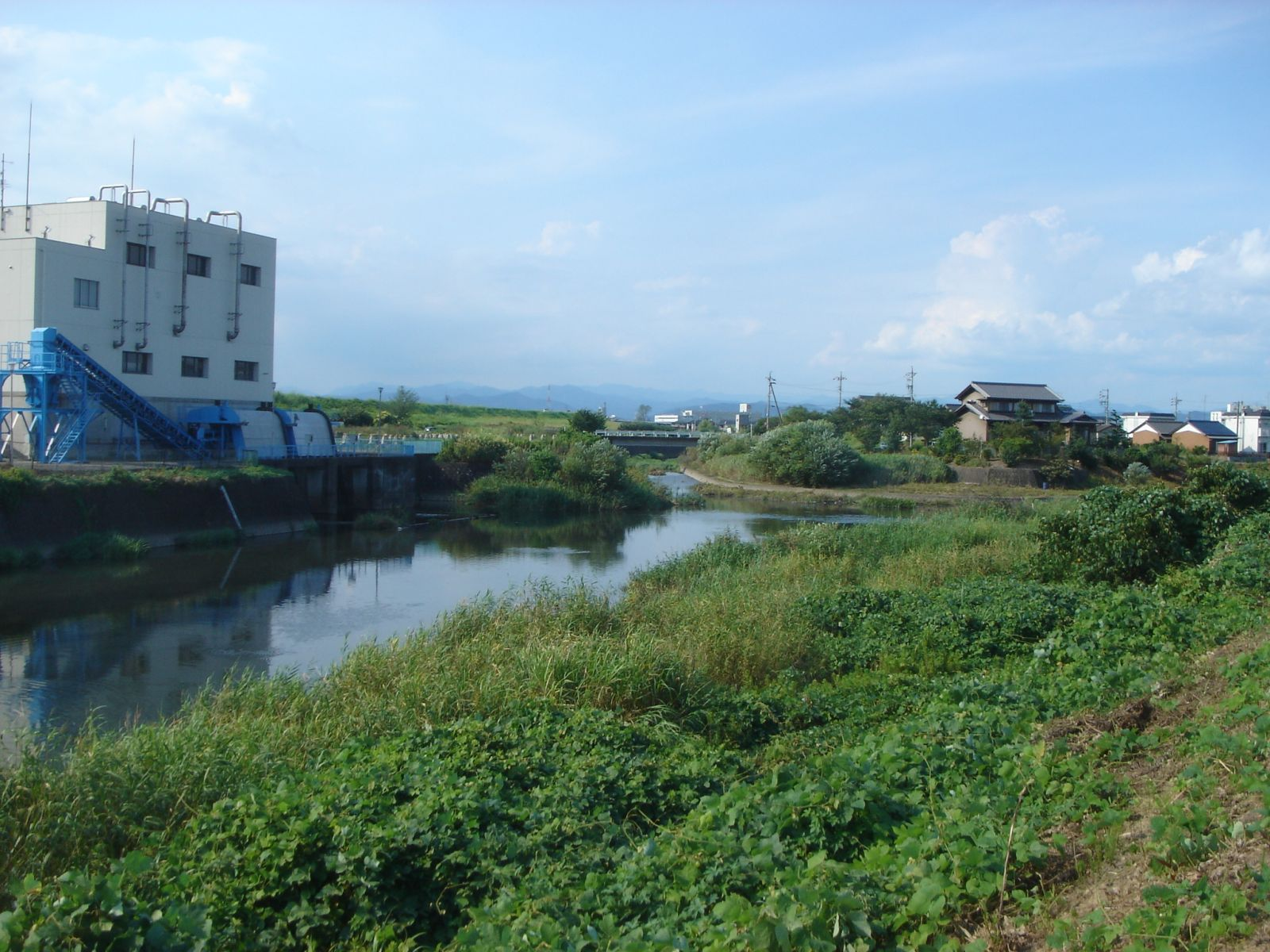
Two of the music videos from Night Fishing were shot on location in Japan. "Sample" was shot in Shizuoka Prefecture close to Mount Fuji, and "Night Fishing Is Good" at the Arata River in Gifu.

The album was first announced on November 12, 2007. In December, Sakanaction traveled to the Tokyo area to promote the album, where they performed at the Countdown Japan 07/08 new year's music festival.

On December 5, the songs "Word" and "Sample" were released as a two-track single to iTunes. On December 26, the song "Night Fishing Is Good" was similarly released as a stand-alone digital download to promote the album. "Sample" was chosen as the album's leading promotional track, receiving heavy rotation on radio stations such as Hokkaido's FM North Wave in early February, while "Word" received minor airplay during the same period.

Three songs on the album were promoted with music videos: "Word", "Sample" and "Night Fishing Is Good". The music video for "Sample" was recorded on December 20, at a lake close to Mount Fuji in Shizuoka Prefecture, and was directed by Kanji Suto. "Night Fishing Is Good" was shot in a single day during the new year period in 2008 at the Arata River in Gifu, in two takes, by "Mikazuki Sunset" director Yoshihiro Mori. It was released after the album was available in stores, on February 4.

In mid-January, the band unveiled a special website for Night Fishing, featuring sound samples and song commentary by Ichiro Yamaguchi, and also opened their official MySpace profile. Sakanaction were featured on the February 26 episode of Fuji Television's Factory, where they performed a four-song set, featuring "Sample" as well as songs from Go to the Future. Special features on Sakanaction were published in the magazines Pia, Musica, Barfout!, Bass Magazine and Rockin' On Japan.

In March 2008, the band held a Japan-wide tour to promote the album, 2nd Album 2008 "Night Fishing Is Good". The tour began in Nagasaki on March 1, and finished in Osaka on March 29. In 2015, the band re-released their studio albums, due to the pregnancy of their bassist Ami Kusakari. In March, Night Fishing was released for the first time as a lossless digital release and as a vinyl record/ A remastered CD edition was also released during this time.

== Reception ==
=== Critical reception ===
Critical reception in Japan to the album was positive. Music journalist Takehiko Hosaka gave a very positive review of the album, noting the band's new and wider direction, and felt it was at the forefront of modern pop music. He felt that Night Fishing had a Don Quixote-like strong volition that was easy to become obsessed about. CDJournal reviewer Mori listed it as his third favorite release of the year, praising the word-play, melodies and arrangements on Night Fishing. Yuji Tanaka of CDJournal praised the album's addition of "opera-like choral work" on the album, noting it as the biggest change compared to Go to the Future.

Haruki Terada of Musica believed that the album was a great improvement on Go to the Future in all aspects, calling it a "masterpiece". He felt that the album's experimentation was "special", likening it to the lyricism and eloquence of 1970s Japanese kayōkyoku songs. He noted that Yamaguchi's "transparent" vocals expressed pain no matter how he sang, and felt that the band were able to incorporate funk elements due to the band having a keyboardist. Terada felt that there were three important factors to the album's success: Yamaguchi's vocals, the "intimacy" felt between band members, and Yamaguchi's songwriting skills; something that Terada saw as a strong unchanging factor between Go to the Future and Night Fishing. Terada felt that the album's lyrics had a consistent poetic worldview, and often switched between sentimentality and frigidity.

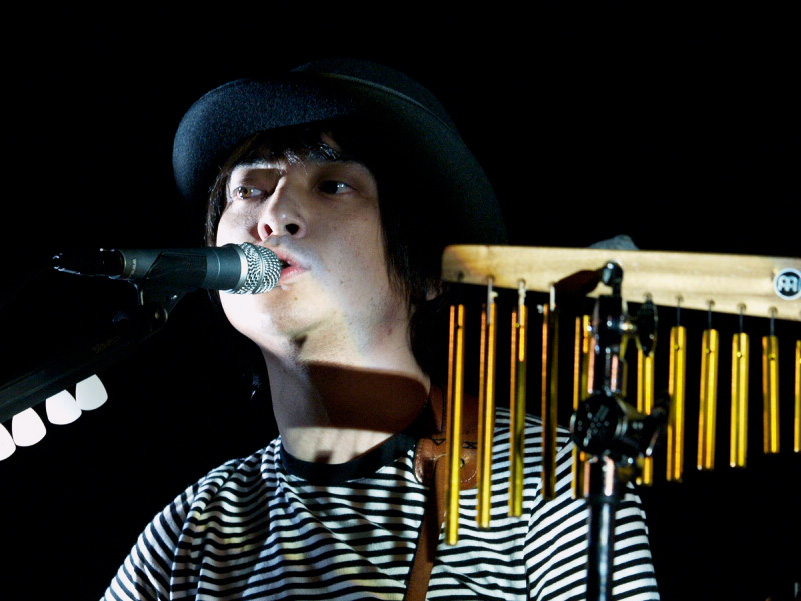
Kei Iwasaki of the band Sekaiichi felt that vocalist Ichiro Yamaguchi's love of 1990s pop and electronic musicians such as Daft Punk and Cornelius (pictured) heavily expressed itself on the album.

Atsushi Sasaki of Invitation described the album's appeal being its "fusion of home recorded-style arrangements and US indie-like band sound, overlaid with naive and noble vocals." He felt like Night Fishing inherited the "bedroom techno meets guitar pop" that the Japanese bands Supercar and Quruli had in the early 2000s. He noted progressive aspects to the album's style, but felt that the band were still in the process of growth. Terada felt that the reason why many people saw the band as being a successor to Supercar and Quruli was not just their "nostalgic soundwork": a mix of kayō and speedy inorganic four on the floor arrangements, but simply Yamaguchi's "comfortable" vocals.

Shunsuke Kosugi of Musica called the use of electronic beats on the album "excellent", praised them as "detailed" and "precise", and noted how they stirred up nostalgic feelings that "pulled at the heartstrings". Kosugi felt that there was a uniformity to the beats on the album, and stressed that listeners should listen to the work as a whole to experience this properly. Reviewers for So-en praised the album for Yamaguchi's vocals and Sakanaction's atypical band sound, feeling that listening to the album created a "floating feeling like being in space". They further praised Yamaguchi's "unique" lyrical worldview, and the high level of perfection found in the recordings.

Kei Iwasaki of the band Sekaiichi, writing for Musica, felt that Ichiro Yamaguchi's dual love of 1990s pop music and electronic musicians such as Daft Punk and Cornelius strongly expressed itself throughout the album. He lauded Sakanaction's efforts to mix electronica and pop, but felt that mixing these two genres was a double-edged sword that invariably influenced the composition of songs. Because of this, he felt that Night Fishing might be more successful musically if the songs were re-recorded.

=== Commercial reception ===
In its debut week, Night Fishing was the number 53 most sold album in Japan, according to the Japanese music chart Oricon, selling 3,500 copies. This was more than double the number of Go to the Future, which had sold 1,500 copies and reached number 105. It continued to chart in the top 300 albums for an additional four weeks, selling a further 3,600 copies. During the release of the band's single "Aruku Around" in January 2010, the album re-charted for a single week, bringing the total tracked number of copies sold to 7,600: 2,400 more than Go to the Future. In 2015 the album was reissued, selling an additional 1,500 copies. In tracking regional sales, CDJournal noted the album had mid-level charting success in Tokyo and charted highly in Sapporo, however under-performed in Hokkaido position-wise compared to Go to the Future. Much like Go to the Future, the album did not see particularly strong sales in the regional centers of Nagoya, Osaka and Fukuoka.

== Track listing ==
All lyrics are written by Ichiro Yamaguchi.

Night Fishing track listing
No.	Title	Music	Length
1.	"Word" (ワード Wādo)	Yamaguchi	4:32
2.	"Sample" (サンプル Sanpuru)	Yamaguchi	4:41
3.	"Night Fishing Is Good" (ナイトフィッシングイズグッド Naito Fisshingu Izu Guddo)	Yamaguchi	6:18
4.	"Ame wa Kimagure" (雨は気まぐれ, "The Rain Is Whimsical")	Yamaguchi	3:57
5.	"Malaysia 32" (マレーシア32 Marēshia Sātitsū)	Sakanaction	5:10
6.	"Uneri" (うねり, "Swirling")	Yamaguchi	4:46
7.	"Teenage" (ティーンエイジ Tīneiji)	Yamaguchi	5:27
8.	"Aishū Train" (哀愁トレイン, "Sorrow Train")	Yamaguchi	3:33
9.	"Atarashii Sekai" (新しい世界, "New World")	Yamaguchi	4:49
10.	"Amsfish" (アムスフィッシュ Amusufisshu)	Yamaguchi	6:28
Total length:			49:51

== Personnel ==
Personnel details were sourced from Night Fishing's liner notes booklet.

Sakanaction

- All members – arrangement, production, songwriting (#5)
- Keiichi Ejima – drums
- Motoharu Iwadera – guitar
- Ami Kusakari – bass guitar
- Emi Okazaki – keyboards
- Ichiro Yamaguchi – vocals, guitar, songwriting (#1–4, #6–10)

Personnel and imagery

- Brown Post – mixing, recording
- Hatos – artwork
- Kentaro Ishikawa – A&R
- Daisuke Ishizaka – photography
- Ted Jensen – mastering (2015 reissued edition)
- Kamikene – artwork direction, design
- Kotaro Kojima – mastering
- Yasumura Kubota – executive producer (BabeStar)
- Yujiro Mitsugi – manager
- Natural Bicycle – clothing cooperation
- Tatsuya Nomura – executive producer (Hip Land Music Corporation)
- Normalization – artwork
- Takeshi Takagaki – supervisor (BabeStar)
- Wataru Woka – A&R

== Charts ==
Chart (2008)	Peak position
Japan Billboard Top Albums Sales	54
Japan Oricon weekly albums	53
Chart (2015)	Peak position
Japan Oricon weekly albums	62

=== Sales ===
Chart	Amount
Oricon physical sales	9,000

== Release history ==
Region	Date	Format	Distributing Label	Catalogue codes
Japan	January 23, 2008	CD, digital download	BabeStar Label	VICB-60029
Taiwan	April 10, 2009	CD	Rock Records	GUT2261
South Korea	April 13, 2009	digital download	J-Box Entertainment	—
Worldwide	July 15, 2009	digital download	Victor Entertainment	—
Japan	March 18, 2015	lossless digital download	Victor Entertainment	VEAHD-10613
Japan	March 25, 2015	CD, LP record	Victor Entertainment	VICL-64344, VIJL-60146-7
