= Mikazuki Sunset =

- 2003 concert venue single release by Dutchman

Song by Sakanaction

from the album Go to the Future
- Language: Japanese
- Released: May 9, 2007
- Recorded: 2007
- Genre: Techno, electronica, post-rock
- Length: 3:47
- Label: BabeStar Label
- Songwriter: Ichiro Yamaguchi
- Producer: Sakanaction

"Mikazuki Sunset" (Japanese: 三日月サンセット, Hepburn: Mikazuki Sansetto; "Crescent Moon Sunset") (Japanese pronunciation: [mikazɯki saɰ̃setto]) is a song written by Japanese musician Ichiro Yamaguchi. Originally released as a concert-exclusive single in 2003 by his high school band Dutchman, it was the leading promotional song from Yamaguchi's major label band Sakanaction's debut studio album Go to the Future.

== Background and development ==
In 1998, Ichiro Yamaguchi while attending high school in Sapporo formed Dutchman, a rock band inspired by British rock. Yamaguchi acted as the band's vocalist and primary songwriter. In 2002, the band released Demonstration, an album compiled of seven demos the band recorded between 2000 and 2002.

"Mikazuki Sunset" was a song Yamaguchi wrote while still living at his family home in Tomioka-chō, Otaru, and was written for a girl he liked called Hanako. He wrote the song's words at the same time as the music, and was inspired by there actually being a crescent moon in the sky that night. In late 2002, the band began performing "Mikazuki Sunset", which had a markedly different approach, featuring techno-inspired electronic samples and synths, instead of the band's typical rock sound. It was originally performed with a rock sound, but Yamaguchi felt that a purely rock arrangement did not create the imagery he wanted to express, and incorporated dance music. On October 27, 2003, the song was released by the band as a single exclusively sold at concert venues. Yamaguchi's experiments with electronic samples caused the band to break up, due to creative differences.

In 2004, Yamaguchi took the name Dutchman for his solo project, where he created dance music and worked as a DJ. When Yamaguchi was asked to create remix of the song "Shiranami Top Water" for the compilation album Music for Pardisco in 2004, he found it difficult to create the entire song by himself. This led him to ask Dutchman guitarist Motoharu Iwadera to start working with him again, and the pair created the band Sakanaction. After three additional members of the band joined, Sakanaction made their major debut in 2007, with the album Go to the Future. Yamaguchi re-arranged "Mikazuki Sunset" so many times since its original incarnation without any particular goal in mind, so that when the band finally recorded the Go to the Future studio take, Yamaguchi had a sense of true accomplishment.

== Composition ==
"Mikazuki Sunset"
Critics noted the album's strong use of surround sound, such as in the introduction of "Mikazuki Sunset".

"Mikazuki Sunset" is a song in verse–chorus form, recorded in common time with a major key of D♭ and minor key of B♭ and lasting for three minutes and forty-four seconds. The song begins with an instrumental intro with a chord progression of G♭maj_{7}-A♭_{6}-B♭m, featuring a bassline, guitars and keyboards. This section features an extreme usage of split-channel surround sound. The song is based on a series of the same four looping guitar chords, except for the chorus which features a progression of G♭maj_{7}-A♭_{6}/Fm-B♭m. The song ends with an instrumental coda. The song was arranged with a mix of acoustic instruments and electronic synths. The song's tempo was set at 122 bpm, to make it easier for the band's drummer Keiichi Ejima, who had not experienced much dance music before.

The song's lyrics are set at night time, where the song's protagonist is cycling while sadly looking at an evening moon. They think about the words that his former girlfriend used to "fill into the cracks of [his] irritatingly lived days." The protagonist hides the shadow of a crescent moon with his thumb, and "[pushes] it far into [his] dry eyes." The song's second setting is at sunset, describing someone "looking over [her] shoulder, perhaps thinking of what to say," while the protagonist wonders if their lies and worries were constantly repeating.

== Promotion and release ==
In mid-2006, Sakanaction sent a demo of "Mikazuki Sunset" to College Radio Japan Sapporo, managing to be in the top five weekly songs for the radio program. In 2007, the song was used as the leading promotional song for the band's major label debut album, Go to the Future. The studio version of "Mikazuki Sunset" first impacted radio stations in Hokkaido in mid-April. In May, the song managed to reach number two on FM North Wave's airplay and sales chart, the Sapporo Hot 100. Radio data compiler Plantech tracked the song as being the second most played song in Hokkaido in early May. "Mikazuki Sunset" eventually became the 66th most successful song of 2007 on the Sapporo Hot 100. "Mikazuki Sunset" was used on several television programs as opening or closing credit music, including MM-TV on Mainichi Broadcasting System, Music-03 on Chiba Television Broadcasting and Yumechika 18 on Hokkaido Television Broadcasting. A live performance of the song was broadcast on Yumechika 18 on May 16, based on footage of the band's performance at the Sapporo Kraps Hall on April 28.

Four live performances have been released commercially by Sakanaction. The first was on 'Night Fishing Is Good' Tour 2008 in Sapporo, a four track digitally exclusive EP released onto iTunes. This was followed by Sakanaquarium (C) (2011), featuring footage from the Sakanaquarium 2010 concert held at Shinkiba Studio Coast on May 15, 2010, and the Sakanaquarium 2011 Documentaly: Live at Makuhari Messe (2012) video album, and was revived for the band's Sakanatribe 2014: Live at Tokyo Dome City Hall tour, released as a video album in July of the same year.

Sakanaction's second digital EP Remixion (2008) featured a remix of the song, "Mikazuki Sunset (FPM Everlust Mix)", which was created by Japanese electronic musician Fantastic Plastic Machine. This remix was compiled on the band's compilation album Natsukashii Tsuki wa Atarashii Tsuki: Coupling & Remix Works (2015).

== Music video ==
A music video was produced for the song, directed by Yoshihiro Mori, which was shot on February 23, 2007. It features all of the members of Sakanaction performing the song in a white studio room. Additional scenes feature colorful rubber balls, that bounce and splash into water. In the second half of the video, these rubber balls are superimposed onto the shots of the band performing the song. The video was Mori's directorial debut. He envisioned it as a simple video, where he tried to match the visuals to song's rhythm.

The video was released for sale on iTunes a year after its release, on August 13, 2008. It was compiled onto Sakanarchive 2007—2011: Sakanaction Music Video Collection (2011), a video album featuring all of Sakanaction's music videos recorded between 2007 and 2011.

== Critical reception ==
Atsushi Sasaki of Invitation felt that the song was "remarkable", and it was one of the band's signature songs. CDJournal praised the usage of split-channel sound on Go to the Future as seen in "Mikazuki Sunset". Entertainment Media Kulture praised the song as one of the band's early signature songs, describing it as "natural-like [sound] motifs skilfully pushed towards lyrics describing everyday things".

== Personnel ==
Personnel details were sourced from Go to the Future's liner notes booklet. Music video personnel details were sourced from Sakanarchive 2007—2011: Sakanaction Music Video Collection.

Sakanaction

- All members – arrangement, production
- Keiichi Ejima – drums
- Motoharu Iwadera – guitar
- Ami Kusakari – bass guitar
- Emi Okazaki – keyboards
- Ichiro Yamaguchi – vocals, guitar, songwriting

Personnel and imagery

- Brown Post – mixing, recording
- Yasumura Kubota – executive producer (AD Room)
- Takeshi Takagaki – supervisor (BabeStar)
- Masaharu Terada – executive producer (BabeStar)

Music video personnel

- Yoshihiro Mori – director
- Yoshinobu Nagamori – camera, lighting
- Sakanaction – video cast
