= Go to the Future =

Studio album by Sakanaction
- Released: May 9, 2007
- Recorded: 2006
- Genres: Techno, electronica, post-rock
- Length: 34:36
- Language: Japanese
- Label: BabeStar Label
- Producer: Sakanaction

Sakanaction chronology
Go to the Future (2007)	Night Fishing (2008)

Go to the Future (Japanese pronunciation: [go:tsɯ:zaɸjɯ:tɕa]) is the debut studio album by Japanese band Sakanaction. It was released on May 9, 2007 through Victor Entertainment sub-label BabeStar. Recorded and produced in the band's native Hokkaido in a month, the album compiled the band's early songs, including compositions from the band's vocalist Ichiro Yamaguchi's high-school band Dutchman. The album mixed electronic and rock music conventions, and featured live instruments as a way to conceptually separate the album from pure dance music.

Though not commercially successful nationally, the album was well received in Hokkaido. The leading song of the album, "Mikazuki Sunset", received strong airplay by radio stations such as FM North Wave and FM Hokkaido. Critics praised the album, noting Yamaguchi's distinct vocals and the band's varied electronic and rock sound.

In 2009, the album was made available globally as a digital download, alongside the band's second and third albums Night Fishing (2008) and Shin-shiro (2009). In 2015, the album was reissued on CD, LP record and lossless digital formats.

== Background and development ==
Sakanaction was first formed in August 2005 in Sapporo, Hokkaido. It was originally a two-member unit, consisting of vocalist Ichiro Yamaguchi and guitarist Motoharu Iwadera. Yamaguchi first worked together with Iwadera in the band Dutchman, that formed at their high school in 1998 and performed British rock-inspired music. In 2004, the band broke up, and Yamaguchi took the name for his solo project, where he created techno and club music. Yamaguchi had the idea that it would be interesting to mix electronic music with Japanese-style "folky melodies", so formed Sakanaction with Iwadera.

Bassist Ami Kusakari first joined the band as a support member in December 2005. She was originally in a separate band that often performed at the same events as Dutchman. When her band broke up, Yamaguchi took advantage of this and asked her to join. In the summer of 2006, keyboardist Emi Okazaki and drummer Keiichi Ejima joined the band to form the group's current five-member line-up. Ejima was introduced to Yamaguchi through a friend, and Okazaki was originally a co-worker of Yamaguchi's. Before the band's debut, they mostly performed at live houses around Sapporo. In August, the band made their first festival appearance at the Rising Sun Rock Festival in Yamaguchi's home town of Otaru. During this period, Sakanaction sent demos of their songs "Mikazuki Sunset" and later "Shiranami Top Water" to College Radio Japan Sapporo. Both songs were well received by listeners, managing to be in the top five weekly songs for the radio program, and "Shiranami Top Water" charted in the top 100 songs on FM North Wave's Sapporo Hot 100 chart in September.

While a member of Dutchman, Yamaguchi had been scouted and trained by Victor Entertainment. After they had managed to go through the audition process to perform at the Rising Sun Rock Festival, Yamaguchi sent his material with Sakanaction to his contact at Victor, which led to the band's debut through BabeStar. Originally the group featured three official members, after drummer Ejima had been added, but for the group's major label debut they officially promoted support members Kusakari and Okazaki. The band was unveiled as being on BabeStar's line-up in February 2007.

== Writing and production ==
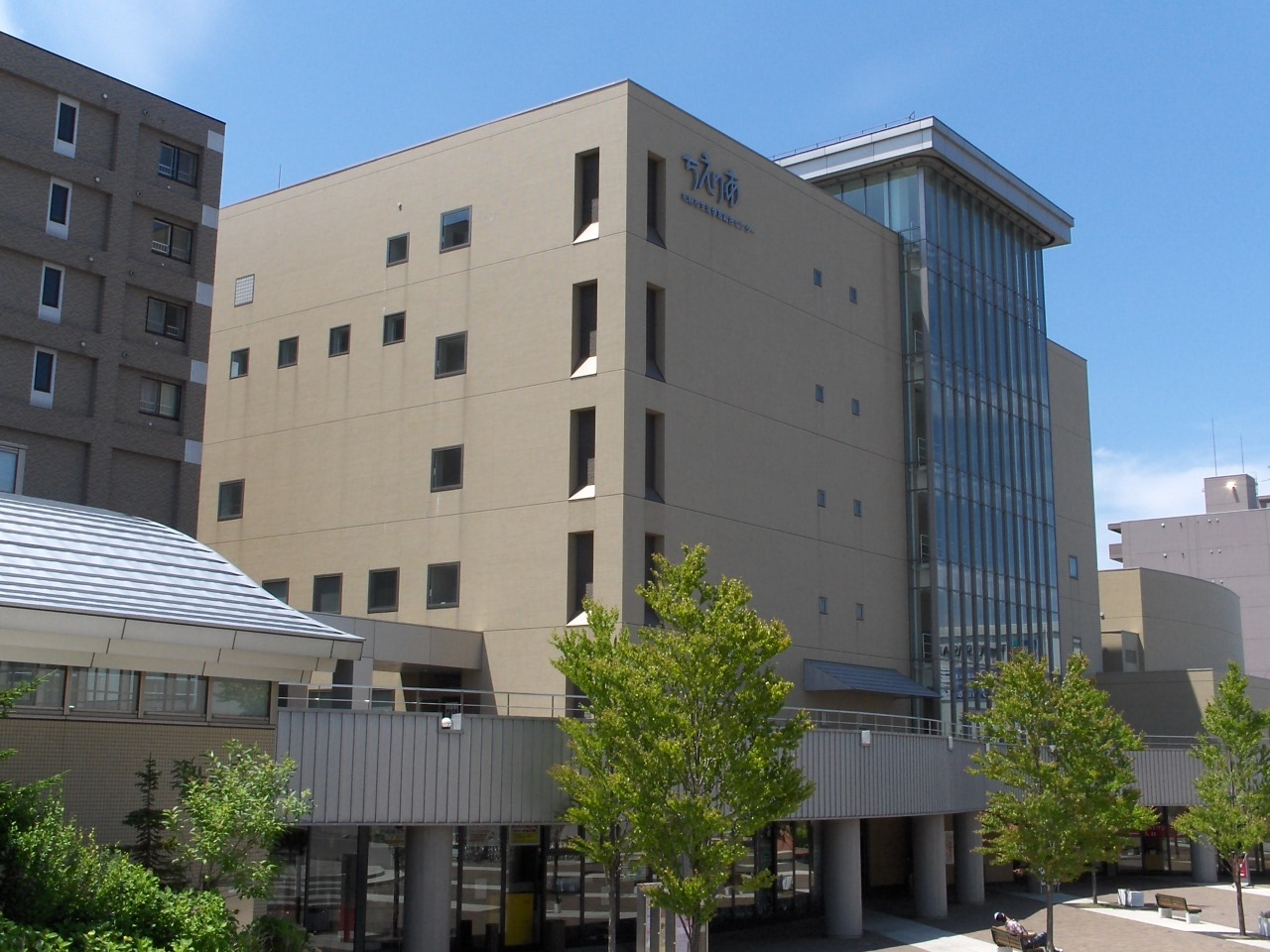
The album was recorded at two locations in Sapporo, the Sapporo Lifelong Learning Center (pictured) and the Yamaha Center.

The album was recorded at two locations in Sapporo, Studio Jack at the Yamaha Center in Chūō-ku, and at Chieria Studio in the Sapporo Lifelong Learning Center in Nishi-ku. After it was commissioned, the album took only a month to produce, as Sakanaction mostly reworked demos they had already produced to create an album. Only the song "Yoru no Higashigawa" was written specifically for the album. Two of the songs had been released by Yamaguchi's first band Dutchman, "Inner World" in 2002 and "Mikazuki Sunset" in 2003. As a soloist, Yamaguchi released a remix of the song "Shiranami Top Water" on the compilation album Music for Pardisco in 2004. Retrospectively, Yamaguchi said that Go to the Future felt like a business card for Sakanaction, due to the album being a compilation of already created songs.

The album was recorded and produced entirely in Hokkaido, including the album's cover artwork and music videos. When writing the songs, Yamaguchi thought up imagery for each song, and asked the other band members to picture this while creating and performing the songs. Yamaguchi created the album's music and melody while thinking about how they would be received by other people, but wrote the lyrics entirely introspectively. "Mikazuki Sunset" and "Shiranami Top Water" were the first songs produced by the band, and were the band's first attempts at making club-style music. Due to their success on college radio, Yamaguchi felt like this was proof that the mix of dance music with Japanese melodies was a good direction, and continued to make music in this style. Yamaguchi was inspired by the differences in house and techno music styles when writing the album. Yamaguchi was mindful about how to reach a wide audience, and considered that live instruments were important to stress how the album was rock music, as pure dance music was based on electronic and sampled instruments. One convention the band kept for the album was to record everything at 126BPM, to make it easier for the band's drummer, who had not experienced performing dance music before.

"Mikazuki Sunset"
Critics noted the album's strong use of surround sound, such as in the introduction of "Mikazuki Sunset".

"Shiranami Top Water"
Critics praised the blend of dance music with traditional rock, such as in "Shiranami Top Water".

Yamaguchi considered folky melodies on top of techno and house music the core of Sakanaction's sound on Go to the Future. In a retrospective interview conducted with Rockin' On Japan in 2011, Yamaguchi felt that his need to construct his own personal musical vision was too strong, and felt like the other members of Sakanaction had too little say in the album's content. "Amefura" was the first song that Sakanaction worked on together as a five-piece band, and was created to be a playful song mixing American and French styles. "Go to the Future" was originally an acoustic song, that grew into a triple metre song when the band developed their electronic sound. The song as the band originally envisioned it was re-recorded for their 2015 compilation album Natsukashii Tsuki wa Atarashii Tsuki: Coupling & Remix Works. Footage on the visual media disc of the album shows Yamaguchi and Iwadera returning to the studio where they had originally performed the song in Sapporo, to recreate the song. The published version of the song "Fukurō" found on the album used the ad-libbed lyrics Yamguchi had created while composing the guitar chords of the song.

== Promotion and release ==
The album was primarily promoted by the song "Mikazuki Sunset". The song was used on several television programs as opening or closing credit music, including MM-TV on Mainichi Broadcasting System, Music-03 on Chiba Television Broadcasting and Yumechika 18 on Hokkaido Television Broadcasting. Both "Mikazuki Sunset" and "Shiranami Top Water" received music videos. "Mikazuki Sunset"'s video was directed by Yoshihiro Mori, and "Shiranami Top Water"'s by Hokkaido artist Hiroshi Kondo. A special website was created to promote Go to the Future, which opened on April 26. It featured the music videos of the two promotional songs on the album, as well as song commentary by Yamaguchi.

Live performances of "Mikazuki Sunset" and "Inner World" were broadcast on Yumechika 18 on May 16, featuring footage of the band's performance at the Sapporo Kraps Hall on April 28. Sakanaction performed a short tour of Japan to promote the album's release, performing concerts in Tokyo, Osaka and Nagoya from May 11 to May 13, and held a solo-billed live at Bessie Hall in Sapporo on May 27. The band were featured in many major magazine publications in Japan to promote the album, including Pia, CD Data, What's In?, Barfout! and Rockin' On Japan.

In 2015 the album was reissued, initially on vinyl record and a CD re-release in March, followed by a lossless digital release. Originally the band had planned on releasing a new studio album around March 2015, however could not do so due to bassist Kusakari's pregnancy.

== Reception ==
=== Critical reception ===
CDJournal online reviewers gave the album their star of recommendation, praised the variety of sounds and tempos on the album, as well as the "peculiar musical world" created by Yamaguchi's "dry" vocals layered on top of a "floating-feeling" techno and "funky" sound. They further noted Sakanaction's intense usage of surround sound during the album. Reviewer Yuji Tayama praised the album for its multi-faceted nature, and focused his praise on Emi Okazaki's keyboard work, the band's "funky rhythms" and vocalist Ichiro Yamaguchi's "nostalgic, youthful vocals". He felt the album had a "dazzling" and "refined" pop sense echoed in their "clear 'vocal post-rock' sound", and described the album as being "at times colorful like the pattern of a tropical fish, and at times gloomy like the mood of a deep sea fish". Mayumi Tsuchida of Bounce felt the album's strength was the harmony between the "[rock] band sound smeared with techno and electronica" and Yamaguchi's sorrowful, literary lyrics. She singled out "Shiranami Top Water" as the best example of this, feeling that its "bouncy synths and elegant guitar" worked together to "paint a spiral" and soared together, to create "breathtaking beauty". Retrospectively, Entertainment Media Kulture felt that the album showed Sakanaction still in the process of finding their sound, with many aspects feeling avant-garde.

=== Commercial reception ===
In its debut week, Go to the Future was the number 105 most sold album in Japan, according to the Japanese music chart Oricon, selling 1,500 copies. It continued to chart in the top 300 for an additional four weeks, selling an additional 3,000 copies. During the release of the band's single "Aruku Around" in January 2010, the album re-charted for a single week, bringing the total tracked number of copies sold to 5,000. In 2015, the album's reissued version debuted at number 55, selling 1,500 copies in its first week, and bringing the total copies of the album sold to 7,000. Tracking the regional sales of Japanese Tower Records stores, CDJournal noted a significant number of copies sold in Sapporo. In its first week, Go to the Future was the second most sold album, only behind Mr. Children's B-Side; selling 200 copies at Sapporo's Tower Records and HMV stores. CDJournal noted the album had a mid-level success in two Tokyo locations, notably at the Tower Records Shibuya where it sold 100 copies in the first ten days. However, CDJournal did not note any significant sales in the other regional centers of Nagoya, Osaka and Fukuoka.

In May, "Mikazuki Sunset" reached number two on FM North Wave's airplay and sales chart, the Sapporo Hot 100, while the song "Shiranami Top Water" also received minor radio airplay during this time. Radio data compiler Plantech tracked the song as being the second most played song in Hokkaido in early May. "Mikazuki Sunset" eventually became the 66th most successful song of 2007 on the Sapporo Hot 100.

== Track listing ==
All tracks are written by Ichiro Yamaguchi.

Go to the Future track listing
No.	Title	Length
1.	"Mikazuki Sunset" (三日月サンセット Mikazuki Sansetto, "Crescent Moon Sunset")	3:47
2.	"Inner World" (インナーワールド Innā Wārudo)	4:25
3.	"Amefura" (あめふら)	3:16
4.	"Go to the Future"	4:36
5.	"Fukurō" (フクロウ, "Owl")	5:29
6.	"Kaika" (開花, "Blooming")	3:30
7.	"Shiranami Top Water" (白波トップウォーター Shiranami Toppu Uōtā, "White Wave Top Water")	5:30
8.	"Yoru no Higashigawa" (夜の東側, "East of the Night")	4:09
Total length:		34:36

== Personnel ==
Personnel details were sourced from Go to the Future's liner notes booklet.

Sakanaction

- All members – arrangement, production
- Keiichi Ejima – drums
- Motoharu Iwadera – guitar
- Ami Kusakari – bass guitar
- Emi Okazaki – keyboards
- Ichiro Yamaguchi – vocals, guitar, songwriting

Personnel and imagery

- Brown Post – mixing, recording
- Hakkaman – mastering
- Kentaro Ishikawa – A&R (AD Room/Sapporo)
- Ted Jensen – mastering (2015 reissued edition)
- Atsuko Kitaura – photography
- Yasumura Kubota – executive producer (AD Room)
- Yousuke Ohno (Natural Bicycle) – artwork
- Takeshi Takagaki – supervisor (BabeStar)
- Masaharu Terada – executive producer (BabeStar)
- Wataru Woka – A&R (BabeStar)

== Charts ==
Chart (2007)	Peak position
Japan Oricon weekly albums	105
Chart (2015)	Peak position
Japan Oricon weekly albums	55

=== Sales ===
Chart	Amount
Oricon physical sales	7,000

== Release history ==
Region	Date	Format	Distributing Label	Catalogue codes
Japan	May 9, 2007	CD, digital download	BabeStar Label	VICB-60023
South Korea	March 26, 2009	digital download	J-Box Entertainment	—N/a
Worldwide	July 15, 2009	digital download	Victor Entertainment	—N/a
Japan	March 18, 2015	lossless digital download	Victor Entertainment	VEAHD-10612
Japan	March 25, 2015	CD, LP record	Victor Entertainment	VICL-64343, VIJL-60144~5
