= Ichiro Yamaguchi =

Ichiro Yamaguchi 山口 一郎
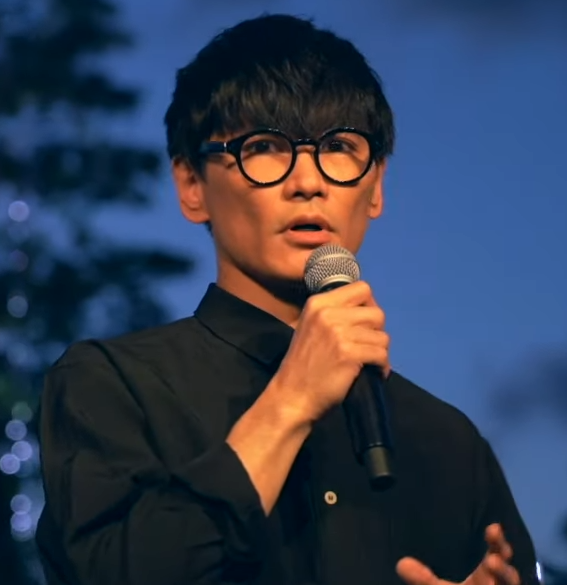
- Yamaguchi in 2019

Background information
- Born: September 8, 1980 (age 46); Otaru, Hokkaido, Japan
- Origin: Japan
- Genres: Rock, pop, electronic
- Occupations: Singer, songwriter, guitarist
- Instruments: Vocals, guitar
- Years active: 1998–present
- Member of: Sakanaction
- Ichiro Yamaguchi's voice Yamaguchi introduces the NF Records sound installation Roof Top Orchestra at Ginza Six in Tokyo; Recorded August 5, 2019

Ichiro Yamaguchi (山口 一郎, Yamaguchi Ichirō; born September 8, 1980), is a Japanese musician. He is the vocalist, guitarist and songwriter for the Hokkaido rock band Sakanaction.

== Biography ==
Ichiro Yamaguchi was born in Otaru, Hokkaido in 1980. He grew up listening to a wide variety of music, as his father ran a business that acted as a cafe during the daytime and as a bar at night. His father had lived in Europe for many years, so often played music such as the German electronic band Kraftwerk. The business would occasionally hold performances for musicians, such as Japanese folk singer Masato Tomobe. This variety made it feel natural for Yamaguchi to create multi-genre music. Yamaguchi began to play music naturally, learning how to play the guitar after picking up an acoustic guitar that was in his parents home. The first songs he learnt on the guitar were Kaguya-hime/Iruka's 1970 folk song "Nagoriyuki" and Takuro Yoshida's "Kekkon Shiyō yo" (1972). He was inspired to write lyrics by the large number of second hand books his father bought, such as those of Kenji Miyazawa, Osamu Dazai, Chūya Nakahara and Yoshiro Ishihara, as well as haiku poets Santōka Taneda and Shūji Terayama.

In 1998, Yamaguchi formed a band with his high school friends from Sapporo Daiichi High School, called Dutchman, which performed British rock-inspired music. Yamaguchi acted as the band's vocalist and primary songwriter. Yamaguchi and the band were scouted and trained by Victor Entertainment, however the group never formally debuted with Victor. In 2002, the band released Demonstration, an album compiled of seven demos the band recorded between 2000 and 2002. After six years together, Dutchman broke up due to creative differences, when Yamaguchi tried adding electronic elements into their music, especially on the song "Mikazuki Sunset". It was originally performed with a rock sound, but Yamaguchi felt that a purely rock arrangement did not create the imagery he wanted to express, and incorporated dance music.

Yamaguchi kept the name Dutchman for his solo project as a DJ, where he created techno and club music. He thought it would be interesting to mix electronic music with Japanese-style "folky melodies," and when Yamaguchi was asked to remix the song "Shiranami Top Water" for the compilation album Music for Pardisco in 2004, he found it difficult to create the entire song by himself. This led him back to Dutchman's former guitarist Motoharu Iwadera. They returned to working together again, and the pair created the band Sakanaction.

Sakanaction made their major debut in 2007 when three additional members of the band joined and together they produced the album Go to the Future under the Victor Entertainment sublabel BabeStar Label. After the band's second album Night Fishing (2008), Yamaguchi and the other members of Sakanaction moved to Tokyo in the spring of 2008, and were moved to the main Victor Entertainment artist roster. moving from Hokkaido to Tokyo in the spring of 2008. In 2010, the band had their break-out hit "Aruku Around", debuting at number three on Oricon's single charts.

Since "Aruku Around", the band has seen greater commercial success, with their albums Documentaly (2011) and Sakanaction (2013) both certified gold by the Recording Industry Association of Japan. In 2012, Yamaguchi began writing music for dramatic productions, such as the band's single "Boku to Hana", which was written specifically for the drama Sanjūnana-sai de Isha ni Natta Boku: Kenshūi Junjō Monogatari. Increasingly, songs Yamaguchi has written for Sakanaction have been used in dramatic works, including "Music" (2013), used as the theme song for the Fuji Television drama Dinner, "Eureka" used as the ending theme for the film Judge!, "Hasu no Hana" (2014), written for the film Close Range Love and "Shin Takarajima" (2015), written for the live action adaptation film version of the manga Bakuman.

Aside from Sakanaction, Yamaguchi has collaborated with several musicians. In 2010 he wrote the song "Magic Time" from Johnny & Associates veteran boyband SMAP's 20th album We Are SMAP!. He collaborated with them again in 2012 to write their single "Moment", which was used to promote the Tokyo Broadcasting System broadcast of the 2012 Summer Olympics, and debuted at number one on the Oricon single chart. In 2010, Yamaguchi was a featured vocalist on Base Ball Bear's album Cypress Girls, on the song "Kimino-Me". He collaborated with Base Ball Bear vocalist Yūsuke Koide in 2011 to write the song "Kodona no Kaidan" for idol singer Shiho Nanba, who released the track as a single.

In September 2015, Yamaguchi collaborated with electronic musician Aoki Takamasa and fashion brand Anrealage to create a catwalk soundtrack for the brand's appearance at the Paris Fashion Week. The composition, Reflects, was released digitally on January 20, 2016, and features two versions of the set: an eighteen-minute live binaural recording of the composition as it was used at the event, and Reflects Live Rec 2015, a thirteen-minute real-time live studio recording of Yamaguchi and Aoki creating Reflects.

Since 2012, Yamaguchi has served as a host for a segment on the Tokyo FM radio show School of Lock!, called Sakana Locks!.

== Personal life ==
In 2010 right before the tour for the band's album Kikuuiki, Sakanaquarium 2010 Kikuuiki, Yamaguchi suffered sensorineural hearing loss, and permanently lost hearing in his right ear.

== Discography ==
=== Extended plays ===
Title	Album details
Reflects	Aoki Takamasa x Ichiro Yamaguchi; Released: January 20, 2016; Label: NF Records; Formats: Digital download

=== Production discography ===
List of songs that feature songwriting, production or vocals by Ichiro Yamaguchi outside of his work with Sakanaction
Title	Year	Album	Notes
"Magic Time" (SMAP)	2010	We Are SMAP!	Lyrics and composition. Charted at number 100 on the Billboard Japan Radio Songs sub-chart.
"Kimino-Me" ("Your Eyes") (Base Ball Bear + Ichiro Yamaguchi from Sakanaction)	2010	Cypress Girls	Featured artist. Released digitally three months before Cypress Girls, on June 23, 2010.
"Kodona no Kaidan" (こどなの階段; "Stairs of Childhood/Adulthood") (Shiho Nanba)	2011	Mizuiro Generation	Composition. Collaboration with Yūsuke Koide of Base Ball Bear. Released as a single, reached number 28 on the Oricon single charts.
"Moment" (SMAP)	2012	Non-album single	Lyrics and composition. Released as a single, reached number 1 on the Oricon single charts, certified gold by the RIAJ.
