= Inori (Sakanaction song) =

- Cover of the Inori EP.

Song by Sakanaction

from the album Sakanaction
- Language: Japanese
- Released: June 26, 2013
- Recorded: 2013
- Genre: Tech house
- Length: 5:22 (original); 7:15 (extended mix)
- Label: Victor Entertainment
- Songwriter: Sakanaction
- Producers: Sakanaction, Aoki Takamasa

"Inori" (English: "Prayer", Japanese pronunciation: [inoɾi]) is a song by Japanese band Sakanaction. An instrumental electronic track incorporating non-lexical vocables, "Inori" was a collaboration with the Japanese electronic musician Aoki Takamasa. The song originally appeared as the first song on the band's sixth studio album Sakanaction, released on March 13, 2013. Three months later, "Inori" was packaged with another instrumental song from Sakanaction, "Structure", as the Inori EP, a vinyl record-exclusive release. The record debuted at number 36 on Oricon's weekly singles chart.

== Background and development ==
The band were contacted by the promotions team of Mode Gakuen to write a commercial song for their 2012 advertisements in October 2011, when the band had just begun performing their Sakanaquarium 2011 tour for Documentaly. This was the first time the band had been asked to write a piece of music specifically for a purpose (though songs on Documentaly had been used for commercial tie-ups, these had been organized after the songs had been completed). The band recorded the song after the tour finished, and planned to release it as a single at the beginning of 2012. However, while this was happening, the band were contacted to write a theme song for the Tsuyoshi Kusanagi drama 37-sai de Isha ni Natta Boku: Kenshui Junjō Monogatari, which disrupted their plans for the single. The theme song, "Boku to Hana", was released in May 2012, while the Mode Gakuen commercial "Yoru no Odoriko" was released in August 2012.

The band began recording their next studio album, Sakanaction, in September 2012. Instead of creating and recording songs in a recording studio, the band recorded songs at Yamaguchi's apartment for four months, in order to create music that they truly wanted to produce, in a comfortable environment away from the pressures of a recording studio. The first song they created in these sessions was "Music", which their management organized to be used as the theme song for the Fuji Television drama Dinner, even though Yamaguchi had not finished the song's lyrics. Originally the band intended for "Music" to be the leading promotional track for Sakanaction and not released as a physical single before it was chosen as a drama theme song. "Music" was released as a single on January 23, 2013, as a special price-reduced single, featuring only a single B-side. On February 16, the band finished the recording sessions for Sakanaction.

The band released Sakanaction on March 13. It reached number one on Oricon's albums chart with 83,000 copies sold, becoming their most commercially successful release in their career. After the album's release, the band held their annual tour, Sakanaquarium 2013. This tour featured 17 dates performed from March to June, including two dates at the Makuhari Messe and one at the Osaka-jō Hall. The tour final was held on June 15 at the Wall in Taipei; their first solo concert held outside of Japan.

== Writing and inspiration ==
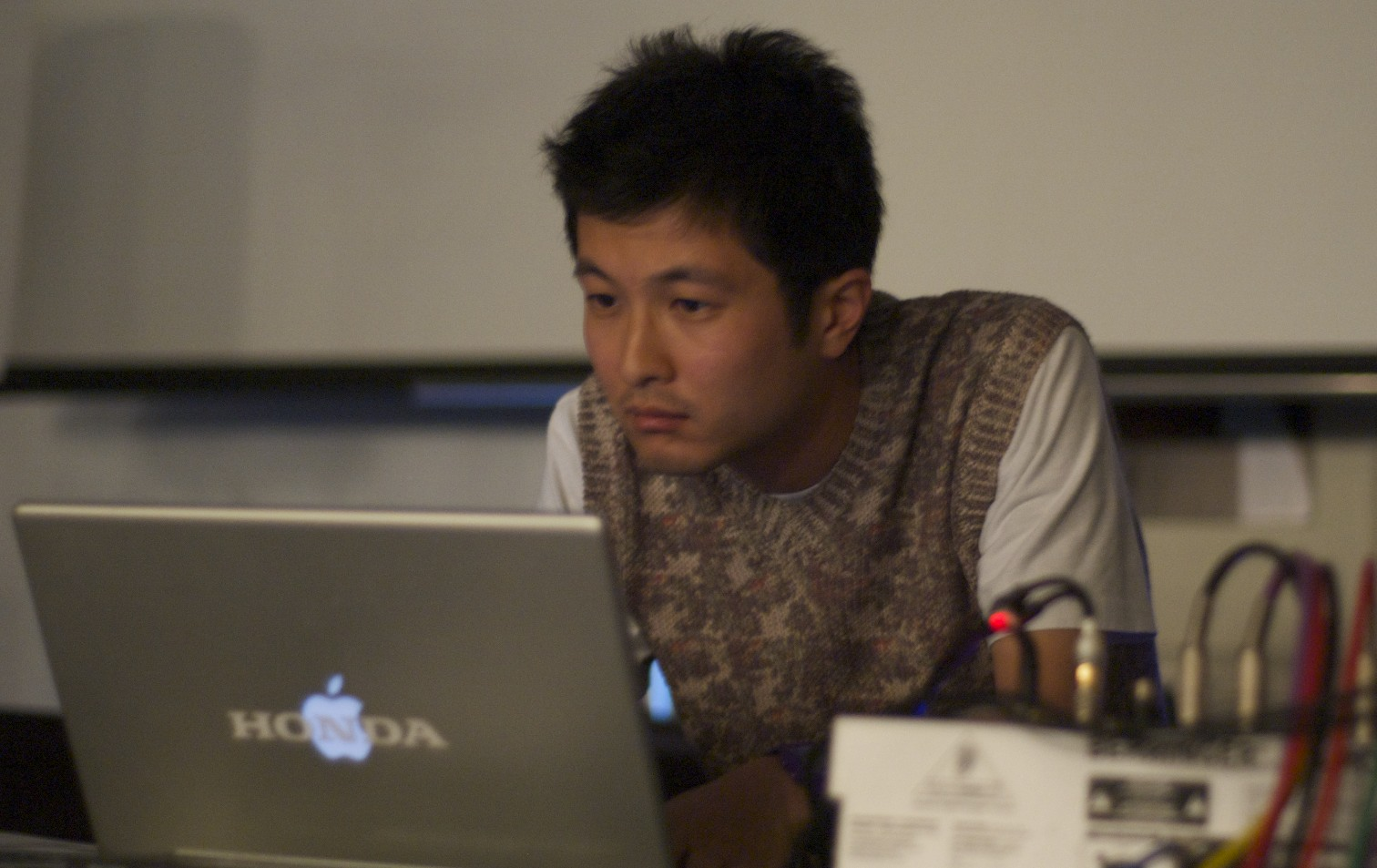
Electronic musician Aoki Takamasa collaborated with Sakanaction on the song.

"Inori" was chosen to be the first song on Sakanaction as it would surprise listeners who had only heard the three singles and "Aoi". They saw "Inori", along with the band's song "Structure" as being the complete opposite to what they saw as the outward-facing songs meant for a wide audience that they had used for the singles. The band separated Sakanaction songs into two categories: outward-facing and inner-facing, with the inner-facing songs expressing the type of music that Sakanaction wanted to do personally. They saw "Inori" was the most inner-facing song on the album.

"Inori" was a song created by Sakanaction working together with electronic musician Aoki Takamasa, who worked with the band on the arrangement and mixing. Previously, the band's songs followed a convention that every song had to be able to be performed with only a guitar. "Inori" was their first song that went against this convention, and was composed by Yamaguchi without a guitar. The band wanted "Inori" to be a song without lyrics, in order for listeners to focus on the music itself, without imagery created by the lyrics affecting their impressions of the song.

The band released the extended play under the name sakanaction (ibid.) as opposed to their name in Japanese, サカナクション, which they used for their general releases. This was related to discussions the band had three years prior, where they wanted to use their name in katakana for their general musical releases and "sakanaction" for instrumental songs.

== Composition ==
"Inori"
Critics were impressed by "Inori"'s tech house arrangement, feeling it represented the band's stylistic shift towards dance music on Sakanaction.

"Inori" begins with mixed vocal chorus, then develops into a vocal-less minimalist techno song.

== Promotion and release ==
The band decided on two leading promotional songs for Sakanaction: "Aoi" and "Inori", the two songs they saw as being the most outward-facing and inner-facing songs on the album. Of the two, they chose "Aoi" to be the song sent to radio stations, as they felt "Inori" would not be effectively surprising if people had already heard it on the radio. Instead, the band chose to create a music video for "Inori". During the production stage of Sakanaction, they had discussed releasing the album as an LP record, but scrapped plans when they realized that the sound quality would degrade for the release. Instead, the band decided to release an abbreviated version of the album with a single song on each side, the Inori EP; with "Inori" as the release's A-side, and "Structure" as its B-side. Inori EP was the band's first vinyl record release, prior to their albums being re-released on vinyl later in 2015.

The Inori EP was released on June 26, 2013; three months after its parent album Sakanaction. The band created extended versions of "Inori" and "Structure" with a stronger club music sound, in order for the release to appeal to DJs. The remixes were created in collaboration with Aoki Takamasa, who had worked with the band on the album versions of both "Inori" and "Structure", arranging and mixing the compositions. The release's artwork was produced by Kamikene of the design team Hatos. It features streamlines forming from a north and south pole, which meet in the middle at a line of English text describing the release information.

On June 22, the band organized a special streaming program on Ustream to promote the release. In the early hours on June 23 in Japan, Fuji Television's satellite channel BS Fuji broadcast a documentary about the band's release of Sakanaction, entitled Mezamashi TV presents Sakanaction Micchaku Document: Sakanaction Hyōriittai. The band performed "Inori" as a part of their set-list for their Sakanaquarium 2013 tour. A performance of the band's concert at the Makuhari Messe on May 19, 2013 was released as a video album, featuring a performance of "Inori".

== Music video ==
On June 21, a music video directed by Yasuyuki Yamaguchi for "Inori (Extended Mix)" was released to YouTube. Yamaguchi had previously worked with Sakanaction twice before on the band's music videos, for the songs "Document" and "Boku to Hana". The monochrome video was recorded at the band's release party for their album Sakanaction, held at Liquidroom Ebisu in Tokyo on March 8, 2013. The video shows Sakanaction wearing sunglasses on a stage and standing behind Apple notebook computers, as fans in the crowd dance to the music. Interspersed with this footage are digital affects and images of streamlines.

== Reception ==
=== Critical reception ===
Kazuki Namba of Rolling Stone Japan was impressed with "Inori", describing it as a song that progresses by the power of only its choir-like vocal chorus and beat. He was impressed by the song's new approach, to the degree that he was disappointed when the rest of Sakanaction did not show similar signs of growth. CDJournal reviewers felt that the mixed gender vocal chorus closely resembled the band's song "Night Fishing Is Good" (2007), and called the song's arrangement "surprising". Mayumi Tsuchiya of Bounce described the song as a "cool tech house" song, feeling its place as the first song was symbolic for the album's strong dance music mentality.

=== Commercial reception ===
The Inori EP debuted at number 36 on Oricon's singles chart, selling 2,000 copies. The release spent a total of two weeks in the chart's top 200 singles, charting at number 131 the following week, with an additional 400 copies sold. The song did not receive enough combined airplay and physical sales to chart on the Billboard Japan Hot 100, however reached an identical peak of number 31 on the Hot Single Sales sub-chart, which exclusively tallies physical sales data of singles.

== Track listing ==
All tracks are written by Sakanaction and Aoki Takamasa.

Inori EP
No.	Title	Length
1.	"Inori (Extended Mix)"	7:15
2.	"Structure (Extended Mix)"	6:47
Total length:		14:02

== Personnel ==
Personnel details were sourced from Sakanaction's liner notes booklet. Music video personnel details were sourced from Victor Entertainment's official YouTube channel.

Sakanaction

- All members – co-arrangement, production, composition
- Keiichi Ejima – drums
- Motoharu Iwadera – guitar
- Ami Kusakari – bass guitar
- Emi Okazaki – keyboards
- Ichiro Yamaguchi – vocals, guitar, lyrics

Personnel and imagery

- Aoki Takamasa – co-arrangement
- Rashad Becker – mastering, vinyl cutting
- Minoru Iwabuchi – executive producer
- Kamikene – art direction, design
- Kensuke Maeda – assistant engineer
- Tatsuya Nomura – executive producer (Hip Land Music Corporation)
- Tadashi Owaki – assistant engineer
- Yoriko Sugimoto – A&R director
- Satoshi Tajima – executive producer
- Ayaka Toki – assistant engineer
- Naoki Toyoshima – executive producer
- Masashi Uramoto – mixing, recording
- Satoshi Yamagami – A&R promoter
- Naoki Yokota – executive producer

Music video

- Kazuhiro Hirayama – lighting
- Yoshinori Ishiguro – smoke
- Hayato Kasahara – camera
- Hisashi "Momo" Kitazawa – camera
- Toshinomu Nagasawa – camera
- Miki Nakamura – camera
- Hideyuki Nomura – producer
- OMB – production
- Takaya Saito – camera
- Masatoshi Takizawa – camera
- Yasuyuki Yamaguchi – director

== Chart rankings ==
All figures pertain to the Inori EP vinyl record release.

Charts (2013)	Peak position
Japan Billboard Hot Single Sales	31
Japan Oricon weekly singles	36

=== Sales ===
Chart	Amount
Oricon physical sales	3,000

== Release history ==
Region	Date	Format	Distributing Label	Catalog codes
Japan	June 20, 2013	radio debut (extended mix)	Victor Entertainment	—N/a
Japan	June 26, 2013	12-inch EP	Victor Entertainment	VIJL-60124
