= Aoki Takamasa =

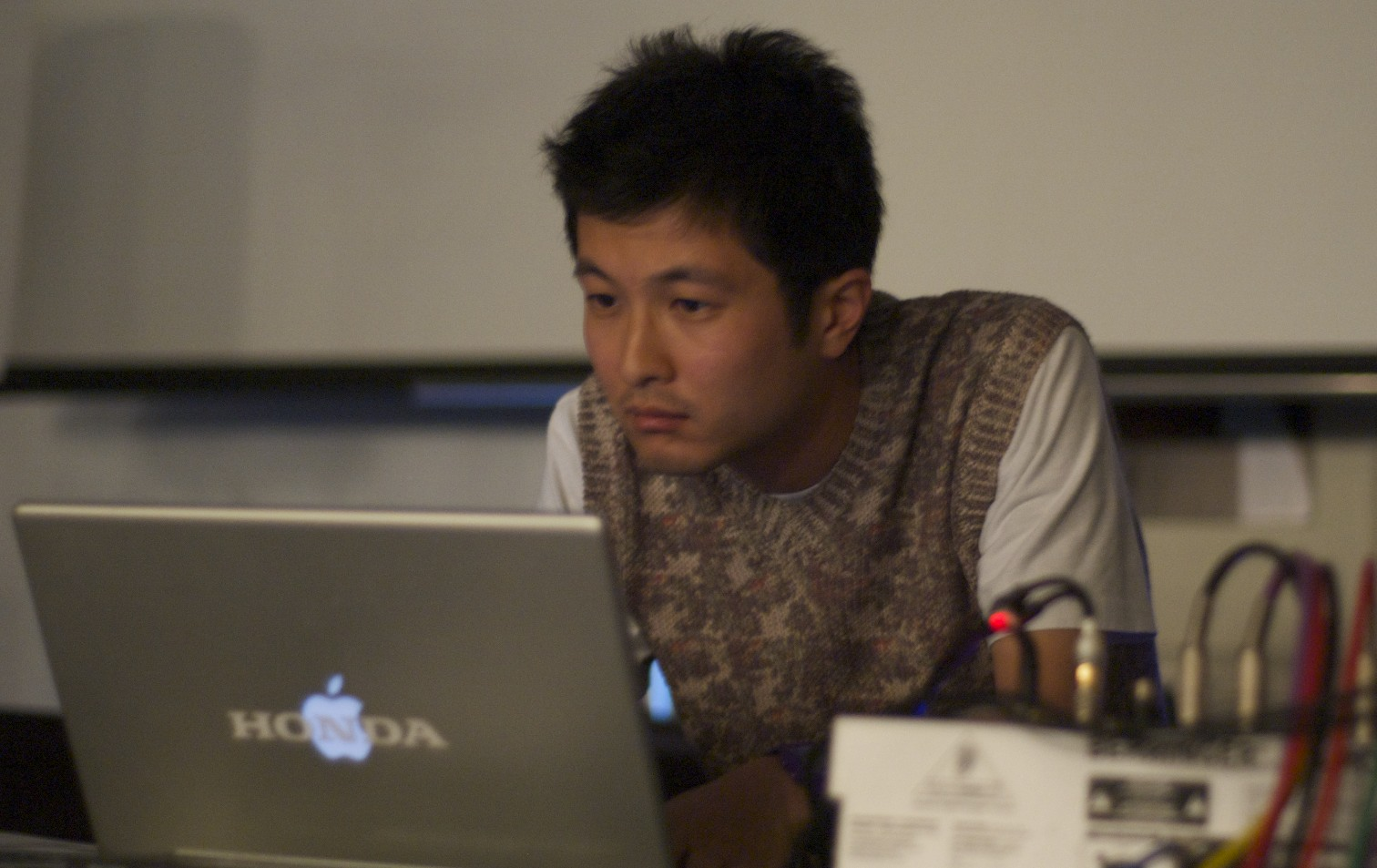
- Aoki at the Goethe-Institut in Boston on May 13, 2010.

Background information
- Born: 青木孝允; 1976 (age 49–50); Osaka Prefecture, Japan
- Origin: Japan
- Genres: electronic
- Occupations: Songwriter, music producer
- Years active: 2000–present
- Labels: Progressive Form, Commmons
- Website: www.aokitakamasa.com

Aoki Takamasa (青木孝允, Aoki Takamasa) (sometimes stylized as AOKI takamasa) (born 1976), is a Japanese electronic musician and producer.

== Biography ==
Aoki Takamasa was born in Osaka in 1976. He began experimenting as a musician in 1993 when he was 17, when he recorded music on a four-track cassette recorder, mixing acoustic guitar, bass and drums together. He continued to experiment with electronic music, and in 2001 he released his first album Silicom through the independent Japanese label Progressive Form. He released a further three albums with Progressive Form until 2004, and one on musician Yoshihiro Hanno's personal label, Cirque Records, in 2003. In 2004 he relocated from Osaka to France, to work with singer Tujiko Noriko to create the album 28 while there. Aoki originally began collaborating with Tujiko in 2002, when the pair collaborated musically by sending CDs in the mail between Osaka and Paris, where Tujiko was based, and decided to move there to further the project.

Aoki based himself in Paris for four years, later moving to Berlin for three. In 2011, he returned to Japan, and based his musical career in Osaka again. During his time in Europe, Aoki released the albums Parabolica (2006) and Private Party (2008) in Japan, and also released music with the European music labels Raster-Noton, Stroboscopic Artefacts and Svakt.

Since returning to Osaka, Aoki has released RV8 (2013), his first release to chart in Japan. Since 2013, Aoki has often collaborated with the band Sakanaction. He co-wrote two of the songs from the band's album Sakanaction: "Inori" and "Structure", had remixed several of the band's songs, and has performed at events organized by the band's personal label, NF Records. In January 2016, Aoki released Reflects, a collaboration with Sakanaction member Ichiro Yamaguchi, featuring music they co-composed for the fashion brand Anrealage's show for Paris Fashion Week.

In addition to being a musician, Aoki spends much of his time as an amateur photographer.

== Discography ==
=== Albums ===
==== Studio albums ====
List of albums, with selected chart positions.
Title	Album details	Peak positions
Title	Album details	JPN
Silicom	Released: January 10, 2001 (JPN); Label: Progressive Form; Formats: CD, digital download	—
Silicom Two	Released: February 20, 2002 (JPN); Label: Progressive Form; Formats: CD, digital download	—
Indigo Rose	Released: December 17, 2002 (JPN); Label: Progressive Form; Formats: CD, digital download	—
Quantum	Released: December 20, 2003 (JPN); Label: Cirque Records; Formats: CD, digital download	—
Simply Funk	Released: June 25, 2004 (JPN); Label: Progressive Form; Formats: CD, digital download	—
28	Aoki Takamasa + Tujiko Noriko; Released: August 18, 2005 (WW); Label: FatCat Records, Hostess Entertainment; Formats: CD, digital download	—
Parabolica	Released: October 1, 2006 (JPN); Label: Op.Disc; Formats: CD, digital download, vinyl	—
Private Party	Released: September 24, 2008 (JPN); Label: Commmons; Formats: CD, digital download	—
RV8	Released: May 9, 2013 (WW); Label: Raster-Noton, P*dis; Formats: CD, digital download, vinyl	275
Sound for Photo Exhibitions	Released: March 7, 2025 (WW); Label: Muzan Editions; Formats: Cassette, digital download	–

==== Live albums ====
Title	Album details
Live Recording 2001-2003	Released: August 11, 2007 (JPN); Label: Cirque.MAVO; Formats: CD

==== Remix albums ====
Title	Album details
Fractalized	Released: January 27, 2010 (JPN); Label: Commmons; Formats: CD

=== Extended plays ===
Title	Album details
Simply Funk EP	Released: June 17, 2005 (JPN); Label: Progressive Form; Formats: vinyl
Aoki / Sawai	Aoki Takamasa & Taeji Sawai; Released: June 17, 2005 (JPN); Label: Op.Disc; Formats: vinyl, digital download
Mirabeau EP	Released: November 4, 2006 (JPN); Label: Op.Disc; Formats: vinyl, digital download
RN-Rhythm-Variations	Released: October 5, 2009 (GER); Label: Raster-Noton; Formats: vinyl, digital download
Monad IX	Released: August 25, 2011 (GER); Label: Stroboscopic Artefacts; Formats: digital download
Constant Flow	Released: March 15, 2013 (GER); Label: Svakt; Formats: vinyl, digital download
Reflects	Aoki Takamasa x Ichiro Yamaguchi; Released: January 20, 2016 (JPN); Label: NF Records; Formats: Digital download
