= Aoi (song) =

Song by Sakanaction

from the album Sakanaction
- Language: Japanese
- Released: February 27, 2013
- Recorded: 2013
- Genre: Rock, pop, electronic dance music
- Length: 4:18
- Label: Victor Entertainment
- Songwriter: Ichiro Yamaguchi
- Producer: Sakanaction

"Aoi" (English: "Blue", Japanese pronunciation: [aoi]) is a song by Japanese band Sakanaction. Used as the 2013 theme song for NHK's broadcasts of professional soccer matches, the song was one of two promotional singles from their sixth studio album Sakanaction (2013). Sakanaction wrote the song specifically for NHK, taking inspiration from soccer, and from the associations of the word blue in Japanese, due to the home jersey color used by the Japan national football team.

Released as a bonus on iTunes for pre-ordering Sakanaction on February 27, 2013, the song was used to promote the album on Japanese radio stations. It peaked at number 27 on the Billboard Japan Hot 100 chart a week after the release of Sakanaction. Critically, CDJournal reviewers responded positively to the song, believing the guitar-based rock, dance beat and vocal choir showed off a signature style of the band.

In 2015, a musical presentation using the song was created by NHK Media Technology and NHK Enterprises, shown in 3D with an 8K resolution and 22.2 surround sound. It was unveiled at the 2015 Media Technology! exhibition in Shibuya in November 2015.

== Background and development ==
The band were contacted by the promotions team of Mode Gakuen to write a commercial song for their 2012 advertisements in October 2011, when the band had just begun performing their Sakanaquarium 2011 tour for Documentaly. This was the first time the band had been asked to write a piece of music specifically for a purpose (though songs on Documentaly had been used for commercial tie-ups, these had been organized after the songs had been completed). The band recorded the song after the tour finished, and planned to release it as a single at the beginning of 2012. However, while this was happening, the band were contacted to write a theme song for the Tsuyoshi Kusanagi drama 37-sai de Isha ni Natta Boku: Kenshui Junjō Monogatari, which disrupted their plans for the single. The theme song, "Boku to Hana", was released in May 2012, while the Mode Gakuen commercial "Yoru no Odoriko" was released in August 2012.

The band began recording their next studio album, Sakanaction, in September 2012. Instead of creating and recording songs in a recording studio, the band recorded songs at Yamaguchi's apartment for four months, in order to create music that they truly wanted to produce, in a comfortable environment away from the pressures of a recording studio. The first song they created in these sessions was "Music", which their management organized to be used as the theme song for the Fuji Television drama Dinner, even though Yamaguchi had not finished the song's lyrics. Originally the band intended for "Music" to be the leading promotional track for Sakanaction and not released as a physical single before it was chosen as a drama theme song. "Music" was released as a single on January 23, 2013, as a special price-reduced single, featuring only a single B-side. On February 16, the band finished the recording sessions for Sakanaction, with the album made available to pre-order on the iTunes Store two weeks later.

== Writing and inspiration ==
"Aoi"
Critics from CDJournal believed the song's mix of guitar-based rock, dance beat and vocal choir showed off a signature style of the band.

"Aoi" was commissioned for NHK, when the television channel contacted Sakanaction to write a song for their 2013 soccer broadcasts, after the band had finished recording the backing track for "Music" in late 2012. Yamaguchi wanted to create a song that was easy to interpret, while balancing this with musical styles they personally liked, in order to pursue new listeners from the audience who would hear the song during broadcasts. The song began as a guitar-driven rock song reminiscent of songs from their earlier albums, which the band's guitarist Motoharu Iwadera strongly objected to, as he felt that the band had moved stylistically towards a club-focused electronic dance sound. As a compromise, the band produced the guitar-based rock song with their more recent musical style, feeling that they had created something entirely new by mixing the two styles.

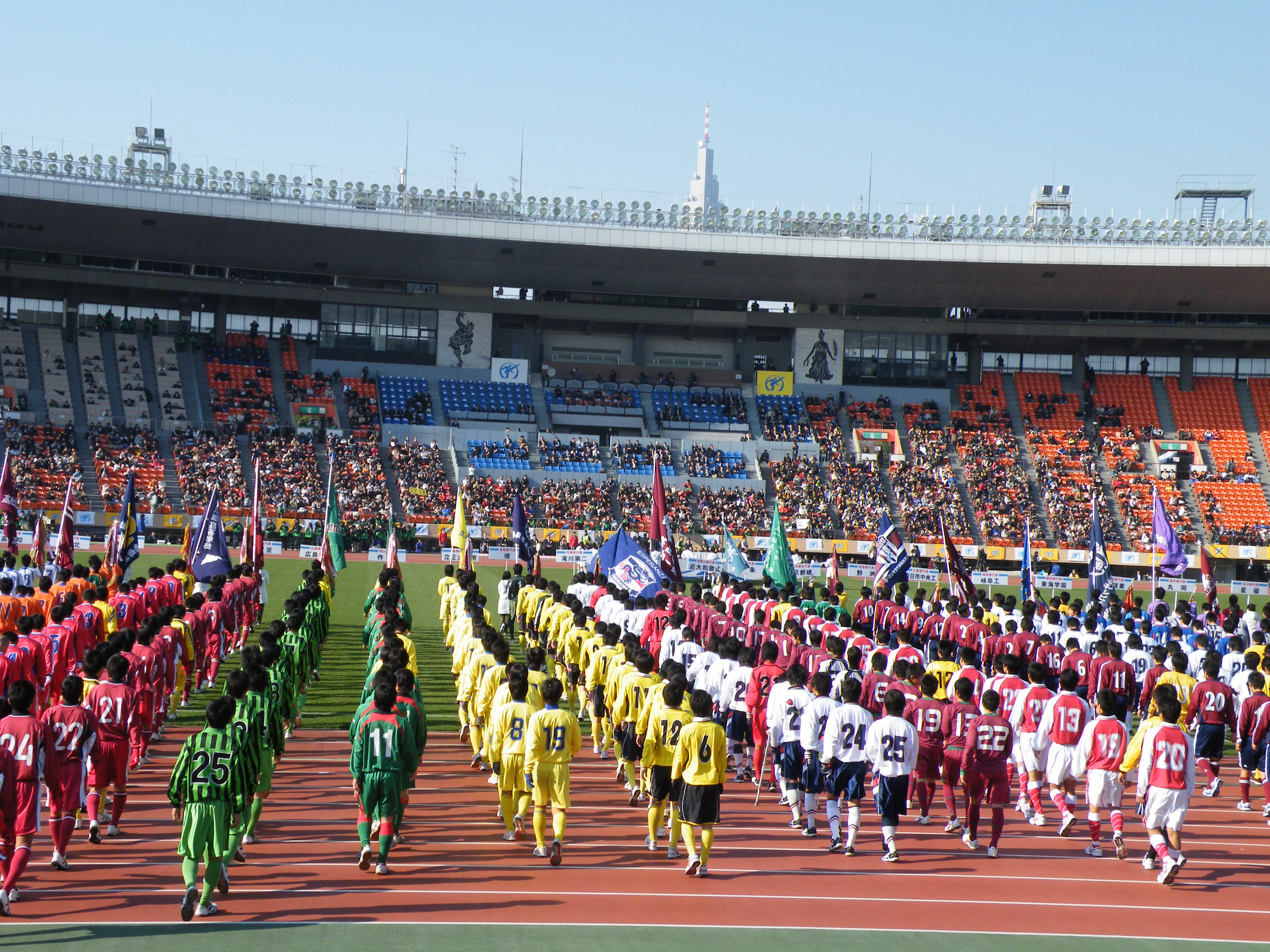
"Aoi" was inspired both by soccer and by "Furimuku na Kimi wa Utsukushii", a 1976 song used by Nippon Television as the theme song for the All Japan High School Soccer Tournament (pictured).

The song was seen by the band as an "outer-facing" song on the album meant for wide audiences and to draw new fans, alongside the album's singles "Boku to Hana" (2012), "Yoru no Odoriko" (2012) and "Music" (2013), as opposed to their "inner-facing" songs meant to express their personal musical tastes. The song was written by Yamaguchi as an homage to "Furimuku na Kimi wa Utsukushii" (1976) by the Birds, a song used by Nippon Television as one of their theme songs for the broadcast of the All Japan High School Soccer Tournament, used in broadcasts since the 1970s. He incorporated choral vocals because of the Birds' song's association with high school sports, believing that this would lift peoples spirits and give them a feeling of expectation for the soccer matches. The band tried to incorporate an image of soccer into the song, and the band members played the Konami video game Pro Evolution Soccer while creating the song.

Lyrically, Yamaguchi themed the song about the present, and wrote about the word ao (青), and its associations with youth, inexperience, beauty, danger, as well as it being the color of the Japan national football team. He attempted to link together the experiences of both soccer players and professional musicians, both of whom he saw as having only brief careers.

== Promotion and release ==
"Aoi" was first announced as NHK's 2013 soccer broadcast theme song on February 14, 2013. The song was first used as a theme song nine days later, during NHK's J.League Kickoff Conference. The theme song accompanied all of NHK's soccer broadcasts for that year, including J.League, the 2013 Emperor's Cup, the AFC fifth round qualifications for the 2014 FIFA World Cup and the 2013 FIFA Confederations Cup. "Aoi" made its radio debut on Sakanalocks, Sakanaction's segment on the Tokyo FM radio show School of Lock! on February 25, 2013. Two days later, the song was made available to download on iTunes as a bonus for pre-ordering the Sakanaction album.

Of the two songs Sakanaction chose as promotional singles for Sakanaction, "Aoi" and "Inori", the band decided to use "Aoi" for radio promotions, as they believed "Inori" was expectation-defying, and would be less effective if their audience had already heard the composition before listening to the entire album. They believed "Aoi" had the feel of a song used in commercial promotions, which would heighten their surprise at the album beginning with "Inori". Sakanaction saw "Aoi" and "Inori" as complete opposites on the album, as "Aoi" was easy to comprehend, and the most outer-focused "business-like" composition on the album, compared with what they saw as the most inner-focused and personal composition, "Inori".

In 2014, "Aoi" was included as one of the playable songs on the Bemani arcade game Reflec Beat Groovin'!!. Two live performances of the song have been released by the band, as a part of the video albums showcasing their Sakanaquarium 2013 Sakanaction: Live at Makuhari Messe 2013.5.19, and Sakanatribe 2014: Live at Tokyo Dome City Hall concerts.

== Music video ==
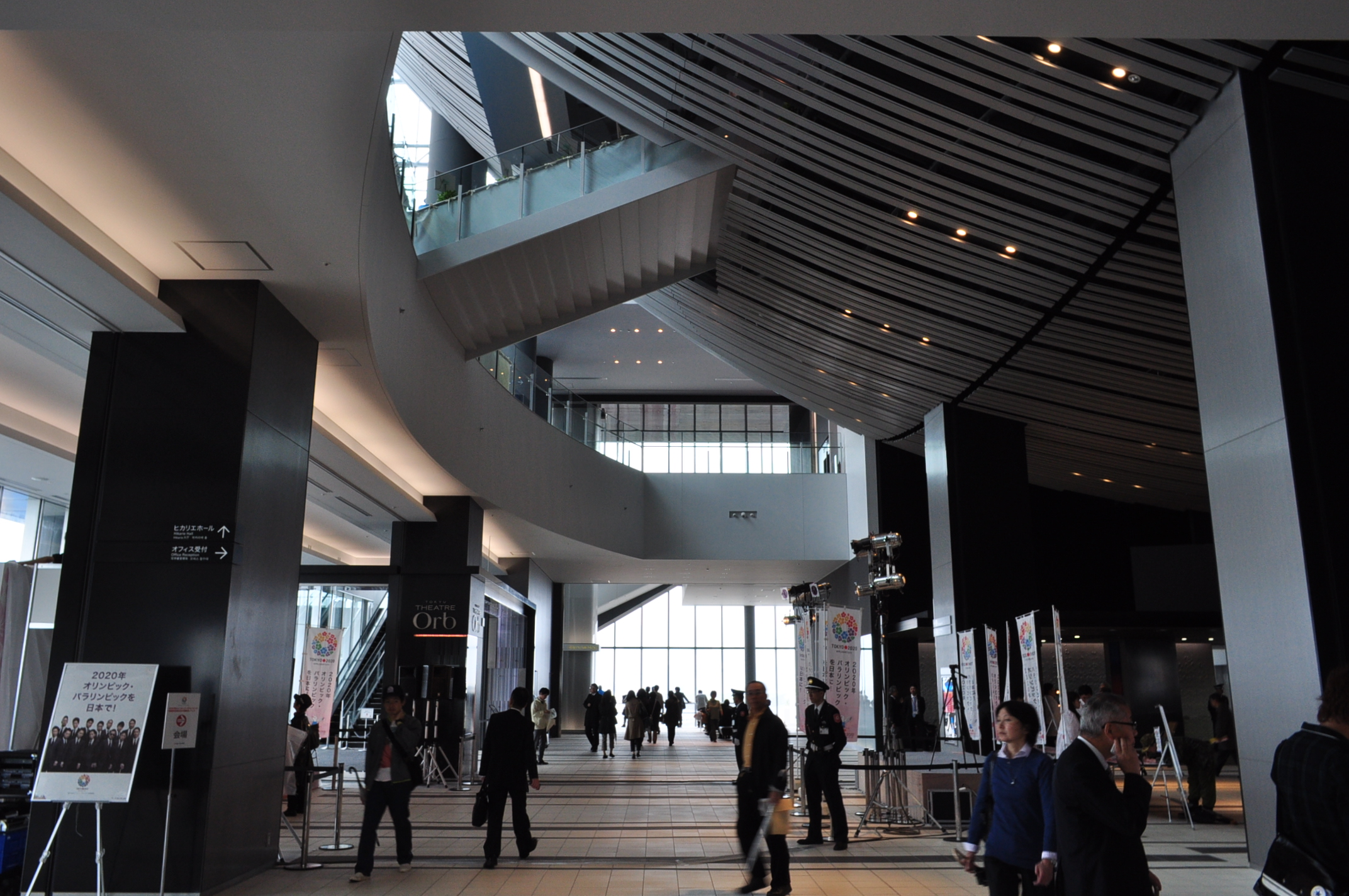
"Aoi"'s video was first shown at NHK Media Technology's exhibit 2015 Media Technology! at the Shibuya Hikarie event hall (pictured) in November 2015.

Though Yamaguchi initially proposed creating a video to "Aoi", it was turned town by Victor Entertainment due to a lack of budget. However, two and a half years later a visual work entitled Aoi Sakanaction (Aoi －碧－ サカナクション; "Blue (Blue) Sakanaction") was produced using the song. A 3D presentation, filmed with an 8K resolution and presented in 22.2 surround sound, the video was unveiled at NHK Media Technology's exhibit 2015 Media Technology!, held at the Shibuya Hikarie event hall on November 12 and 13, 2015. A dual production between NHK Media Technology and NHK Enterprises, the video's art direction was handled by Hiroyasu Kimura of Rhizomatiks Design, and an additional laser show created by laser artist Miu bordered the 3D projection. Sakanaction had previously worked together with NHK Enterprises for the 2015 NHK documentary series Next World Watashi-tachi no Mirai, where the band appeared in the opening of the first episode to perform the theme song, "Goodbye (Next World Remix)", with a visual sequence envisioning 2045.

The video featured a live performance by Sakanaction of "Aoi", interspersed with 3D rendered landscapes and objects, and views of places such as Shibuya. Initially, NHK Enterprises had no current plans to show the video at other venues, due to there being no locations in Japan that were capable of displaying an 8K 3D projection with 22.2 surround sound at the time. The presentation was staged for a second time at South by Southwest in March 2016, at the Hilton Austin Hotel in Texas, where an 8K:VR Theater was installed.

== Reception ==
=== Critical reception ===
CDJournal reviewers felt that "Aoi" showed off a signature style of Sakanaction, and believed the mixed gender vocal chorus invoked the feeling of a school song. They described the song as being a guitar-based rock song with a four on the floor basis, praising the chorus' "strong melody" and "sprinting feeling". The reviewers believed that the song was themed around youth.

=== Commercial reception ===
Despite the song debuting on Japanese radio on February 25, it only began to receive notable airplay from a week before the Sakanaction album's release date. The song was the most successful during the album's release week, where it was the 18th most played song on the radio, and received enough combined digital sales and airplay to reach number 27 on the Billboard Japan Hot 100 chart.

== Personnel ==
Personnel details were sourced from Sakanaction's liner notes booklet.

Sakanaction

- All members – arrangement, production
- Keiichi Ejima – drums
- Motoharu Iwadera – guitar
- Ami Kusakari – bass guitar
- Emi Okazaki – keyboards
- Ichiro Yamaguchi – vocals, guitar, lyrics, composition

Personnel and imagery

- Minoru Iwabuchi – executive producer
- Kensuke Maeda – assistant engineer
- Tatsuya Nomura – executive producer (Hip Land Music Corporation)
- Tadashi Owaki – assistant engineer
- Yoriko Sugimoto – A&R director
- Satoshi Tajima – executive producer
- Ayaka Toki – assistant engineer
- Naoki Toyoshima – executive producer
- Masashi Uramoto – mixing, recording
- Satoshi Yamagami – A&R promoter
- Naoki Yokota – executive producer

== Chart rankings ==
Charts (2013)	Peak position
Japan Billboard Adult Contemporary Airplay	20
Japan Billboard Japan Hot 100	27

== Certifications ==
Region	Certification	Certified units/sales
Japan (RIAJ) Digital	Gold	100,000^{*}
Streaming
Japan (RIAJ)	Gold	50,000,000^{†}
^{*} Sales figures based on certification alone.^{†} Streaming-only figures based on certification alone.

== Release history ==
Region	Date	Format	Distributing Label
Japan	February 25, 2013	radio add date	Victor Entertainment
Japan	February 27, 2013	digital download	Victor Entertainment
