= Tujiko Noriko =

- Born: Noriko Tsujiko (辻子紀子, Tsujiko Noriko); 28 August 1976 (age 50)
- Origin: Osaka, Japan
- Genres: Experimental pop, electronic
- Labels: Mego, Tomlab, Room40, FatCat Records, Editions Mego, Nature Bliss
- Website: www.tujikonoriko.com

Tujiko Noriko (ツジコノリコ; born 28 August 1976) is a Japanese musician, actor and director, from Osaka. She has released music on the Austrian label Mego and the German label Tomlab, among others. Much of her music is composed on a laptop and consists of layered samples, electronic beats, keyboards, and vocal melodies. Her lyrics are in Japanese and English. She is currently living in Paris and is also working on experimental short films.

In 2004, she teamed up with Peter 'Pita' Rehberg as DACM, making the album Stéréotypie. In 2005, she collaborated with French artist Saâdane Afif to create film using four texts by French artist Lili Reynaud-Dewar. She also collaborated with Lawrence English and John Chantler on U (2008), and with Nobukazu Takemura on East Facing Balcony (2012).

She has completed two films: Sand and Mini Hawaii and Sun. In Spring 2012 she was artist in residence at WORM, a Rotterdam-based institute for avant-garde music and art to record new music. In 2019, she co-directed, starred in, and composed the soundtrack for the film Kuro.

== Discography ==
- 化粧と兵隊 keshō to heitai a.k.a. Makeup and Soldiers (2000)
- 少女都市 [shōjo toshi] a.k.a. Girl City (2001, Editions Mego)
- I Forgot the Title (2002, Editions Mego)
- ハードにさせて [hād ni sasete] a.k.a. Make Me Hard (2002, Editions Mego)
- From Tokyo to Naiagara (2003, Tomlab)
- Stéréotypie with Peter 'Pita' Rehberg (2004, Asphodel)
- Blurred In My Mirror (2005, Room40)
- 28 with Aoki Takamasa (2005, Fat Cat Records)
- J with Riow Arai (2005, Disques Corde) - released as duo name "RATN"
- 少女都市+ [shōjo toshi+] (2006, Editions Mego)
- Solo (2007, Editions Mego)
- Trust (2008, Nature Bliss)
- U with Lawrence English and John Chantler (2008, ROOM40)
- GYU with .Tyme (2012, Nature Bliss/Editions Mego)
- East Facing Balcony with Nobukazu Takemura (2012, Happenings)
- 帰って来たゴースト [kaette kita gōsuto] a.k.a. My Ghost Comes Back (2014)
- Kuro (2019)
- Crépuscle I & II (2023, Editions Mego)
- PON (2026, Editions Mego)

== DVDs ==
- HOW TO, videos by graw böckler (2004 raumfuerprojektion)
