= Minna no Keizai Shimbun Network =

Japanese news organization

- Minna no Keizai Shinbun Nettowāku (みんなの経済新聞ネットワーク)
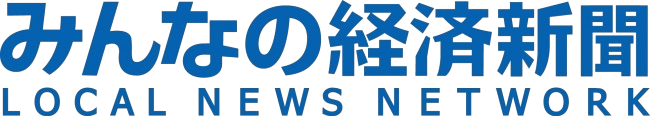

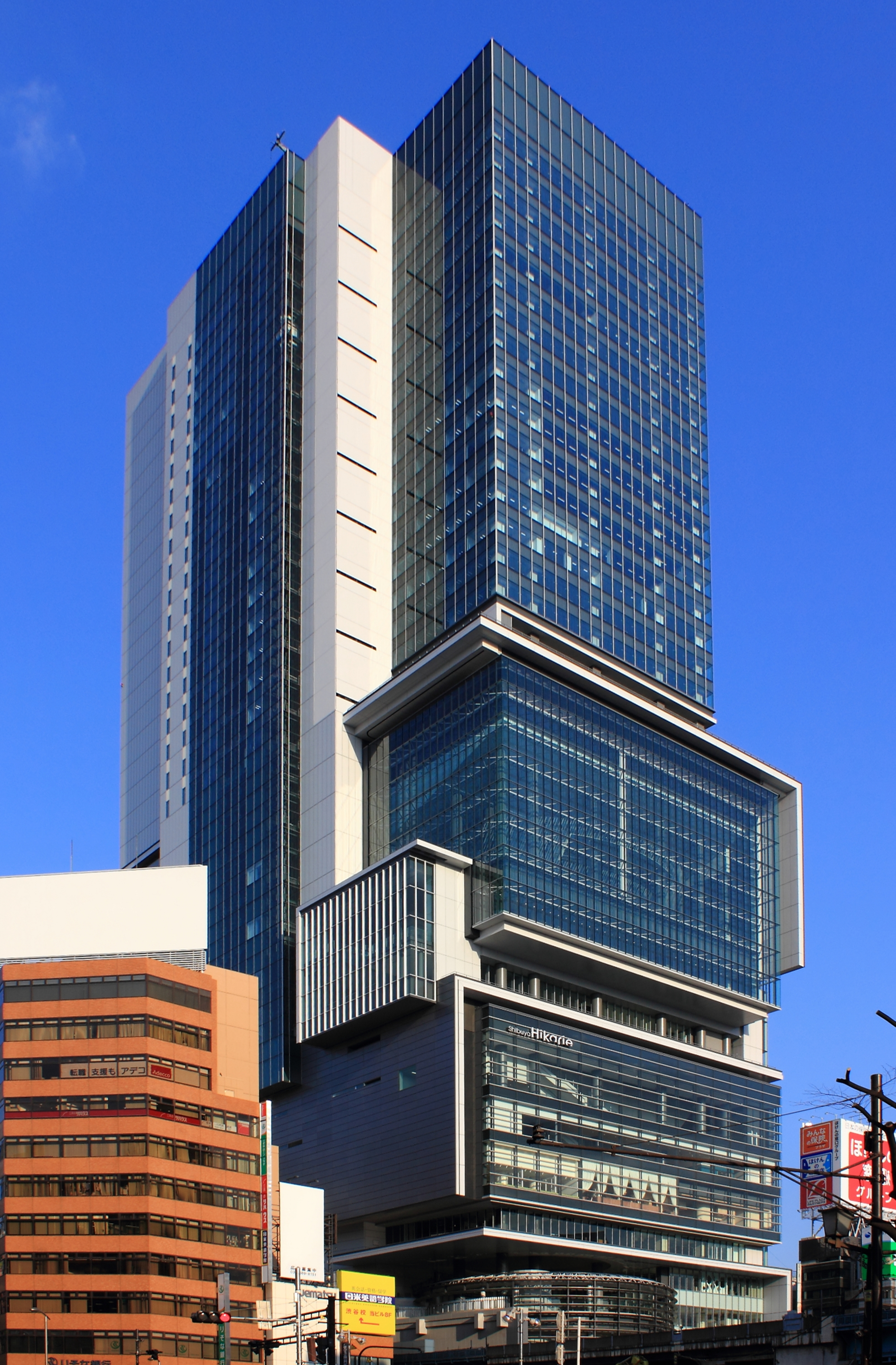
- Headquarters (Shibuya Hikarie)

- Location within Japan Location within Tokyo Location within Special wards of Tokyo
- Nickname: Minkei
- Formation: April 2000 (26 years ago)
- Founder: Tateki Nishi
- Founded at: Shibuya-ku, Tokyo, Japan
- Coordinates: 35.6590°N 139.7034°E
- Region served: Japan and Hong Kong, Vancouver, Taipei and Helsinki
- Members: 138 (2024)
- Official language: Japanese
- Website: minkei.net; minkei.biz

Minna no Keizai Shimbun Network (Japanese: みんなの経済新聞ネットワーク, Hepburn: Minna no Keizai Shinbun Nettowāku; lit. 'Everyone's Business Newspaper Network'), sometimes shortened to Minkei, is a group of Japanese local news websites. Founded in 2000, it is a network of local news websites from various cities in Japan and a few cities around the world.

== Content ==
The websites features local news from various regions across Japan, mainly business news from major cities in Japan such as Sapporo, Sendai, Morioka, Akita, other regions and cities in Japan such as Shonan region in Kanagawa Prefecture, Ise-Shima region in Mie Prefecture, Ishigaki, Okinawa, and districts and wards in Tokyo such as Shibuya, Roppongi, Akihabara, Ginza, Shinbashi, Shinagawa, Ichigaya, and Shinjuku. It also features news outside Japan such Singapore and Vancouver. There is a common rule among the websites that they should publish at least one article per day, cover happy news, and highlight the local economy.

Minna no Keizai Shimbun operates as an application service provider, with different companies and organizations, web production companies or editorial production firms, managing each region. Articles on the websites are also distributed on Yahoo! News Japan.

== History ==
Minna no Keizai Shimbun Network started following the launch of Shibuya Keizai Shimbun in April 2000 by Tateki Nishi, who runs a company in Tokyo handling advertising and web production. He said that he hoped for a news outlet that could catch the city's changes, adding that he chose the name "Shibuya Keizai Shimbun" because he wanted it to focus on the economic activity of their region and act as a "city recorder" rather than reporting on news such as accidents and politics. Shibuya Keizai Shimbun started as a collaborative project with an FM radio station in Shibuya. In 2004, a fan of the website launched Yokohama Keizai Shimbun.

Following that, various young people across Japan who resonated with the network's mission have launched their own local publication with Nishi's approval, naming them "[Place Name] Keizai Shimbun", such as Ropponigi Keizai Shimbun and Tenjin Keizai Shimbun. The network, in collaboration with Hanagata Shohin Kenkyujo Co., Ltd, launched the Minna no Keizai Shimbun News app in April 2015 for iOS and Android. By its tenth year, the network had 55 members. As of 2024, there are 138 websites in the network.

== List of members ==
The headquarters is located at the 33th floor of Shibuya Hikarie, Shibuya-ku, Tokyo.

Region	Name of the publication	City (Note: Location of the head office)	Issuing company	Founding date	Ref
Hokkaido and Tohoku	Akita Keizai Shimbun	Akita, Akita Prefecture	Easner Design Co., Ltd.	April 2007	
Hokkaido and Tohoku	Aomori Keizai Shimbun	Aomori, Aomori Prefecture	Aomori IT Utilization Support Center (NPO)	August 2022	
Hokkaido and Tohoku	Asahikawa Keizai Shimbun	Asahikawa, Hokkaido	Nesty Corporation Co., Ltd.	October 2014	
Hokkaido and Tohoku	Daisen Keizai Shimbun	Daisen, Akita Prefecture	Yamasa Kosan Co., Ltd.	August 2023	
Hokkaido and Tohoku	Fukushima Keizai Shimbun	Fukushima, Fukushima Prefecture	Fungimix Co., Ltd.	March 2019	
Hokkaido and Tohoku	Hachinohe Keizai Shimbun	Hachinohe, Aomori Prefecture	BFM Co., Ltd.	August 2012	
Hokkaido and Tohoku	Hirosaki Keizai Shimbun	Hirosaki, Aomori Prefecture	Consys Co., Ltd.	April 2014	
Hokkaido and Tohoku	Kitami Keizai Shimbun	Kitami, Hokkaido	Kitami Network Media LLC	April 2021	
Hokkaido and Tohoku	Morioka Keizai Shimbun	Morioka, Iwate Prefecture	Radio Morioka Co., Ltd.	July 2007	
Hokkaido and Tohoku	Otaru Keizai Shimbun	Otaru, Hokkaido	Otaru Consulting	March 2013	
Hokkaido and Tohoku	Sapporo Keizai Shimbun	Sapporo, Hokkaido	Den Co., Ltd.	April 2007	
Hokkaido and Tohoku	Sendai Keizai Shimbun	Sendai, Miyagi Prefecture	Simple Text LLC	December 2006	
Hokkaido and Tohoku	Yokote Keizai Shimbun	Yokote, Akita Prefecture	Yokotter Corporation (NPO)	December 2015	
Kanto (Note: Excluding Tokyo Metropolis)	Ashikaga Keizai Shimbun	Ashikaga, Tochigi Prefecture	Comlab Corporation (NPO)	July 2018	
Kanto	Chiba Keizai Shimbun	Chiba, Chiba Prefecture	Pakuchi Co., Ltd.	April 2016	
Kanto	Chichibu Keizai Shimbun	Chichibu, Saitama Prefecture	Yokoze Company Co., Ltd.	June 2021	
Kanto	Chōshi Keizai Shimbun	Chōshi, Chiba Prefecture	Citizens Conference General Incorporated Association	May 2026	
Kanto	Funabashi Keizai Shimbun	Funabashi, Chiba Prefecture	my Funabashi Co., Ltd.	October 2011	
Kanto	Honjō Keizai Shimbun	Honjō, Saitama Prefecture	Future Power Development Association General Incorporated Association	June 2017	
Kanto	Ichikawa Keizai Shimbun	Ichikawa, Chiba Prefecture	Art Curetas LLC	May 2026	
Kanto	Kamakura Keizai Shimbun	Kamakura, Kanagawa Prefecture	Kamakura Station-Front Library Room	April 2018	
Kanto	Kasukabe Keizai Shimbun	Kasukabe, Saitama Prefecture	Local Walker General Incorporated Association	October 2018	
Kanto	Kawagoe Keizai Shimbun	Kawagoe, Saitama Prefecture	GIV Co. Ltd.	October 2015	
Kanto	Kawaguchi Keizai Shimbun	Kawaguchi, Saitama Prefecture	Bunanomori Co. Ltd.	August 2022	
Kanto	Kōhoku Keizai Shimbun	Yokohama, Kanagawa Prefecture	Yokohama Community Design Lab (NPO)	August 2010	
Kanto	Kujūkuri Keizai Shimbun	Ichinomiya, Chiba Prefecture	Ichinomiya-do LLC	January 2025	
Kanto	Kumagaya Keizai Shimbun	Kumagaya, Saitama Prefecture	Web-ya Co., Ltd.	January 2017	
Kanto	Matsudo Keizai Shimbun	Ichikawa, Chiba Prefecture	Prolayer Co., Ltd.	May 2014	
Kanto	Mito Keizai Shimbun	Mito, Ibaraki Prefecture	JOYNS LLC	November 2008	
Kanto	Narashino Keizai Shimbun	Narashino, Chiba Prefecture	i-Company Co., Ltd.	April 2022	
Kanto	Odawara Hakone Keizai Shimbun	Odawara, Kanagawa Prefecture	BLEND Media Center	May 2008	
Kanto	Ōmiya Keizai Shimbun	Saitama, Saitama Prefecture	Community Com Co., Ltd.	February 2012	
Kanto	Sayama Keizai Shimbun	Sayama, Saitama Prefecture	Sayama Community Development Design Project General Incorporated Association	March 2025	
Kanto	Shōnan Keizai Shimbun	Fujisawa, Kanagawa	Fujimani Publishing Co., Ltd.	June 2006	
Kanto	Sotobō Keizai Shimbun	Isumi, Chiba Prefecture	Starlet Co., Ltd.	April 2017	
Kanto	Takasaki Maebashi Keizai Shimbun	Maebashi, Gunma Prefecture	Faith Co., Ltd.	January 2007	
Kanto	Tsukuba Keizai Shimbun	Tsukuba, Ibaraki Prefecture	RAYSIA LLC	November 2018	
Kanto	Urawa Keizai Shimbun	Saitama, Saitama Prefecture	Community Com Co., Ltd.	March 2015	
Kanto	Urayasu Keizai Shimbun	Urayasu, Chiba Prefecture	01 Plan LLC	September 2024	
Kanto	Utsunomiya Keizai Shimbun	Utsunomiya, Tochigi Prefecture	Tsutsumu Create Co., Ltd.	September 2024	
Kanto	Yokohama Keizai Shimbun	Yokohama, Kanagawa Prefecture	Yokohama Community Design Lab (NPO)	April 2004	
Kanto	Yokosuka Keizai Shimbun	Yokosuka, Kanagawa Prefecture	Media 0468 LLC	December 2008	
Kanto	Zushi Hayama Keizai Shimbun	Zushi, Kanagawa Prefecture	Chiiki Miryoku (NPO)	April 2018	
23 special wards of Tokyo	Akabane Keizai Shimbun	Kita, Tokyo Metropolis	Community Business Support Center (NPO)	December 2018	
23 special wards of Tokyo	Akasaka Keizai Shimbun	Minato, Tokyo Metropolis	Kiku Kaku Hanasu Co., Ltd.	May 2008	
23 special wards of Tokyo	Akiba Keizai Shimbun	Shibuya, Tokyo Metropolis	JLOCAL Co., Ltd.	April 2006	
23 special wards of Tokyo	Asakusa Keizai Shimbun	Taitō, Toko Metropolis	Hahaha LLC	January 2014	
23 special wards of Tokyo	Bunkyō Keizai Shimbun	Bunkyō, Tokyo Metropolis	Bono Co., Ltd.	March 2015	
23 special wards of Tokyo	Edogawa Keizai Shimbun	Edogawa, Tokyo Metropolis	Tokyo Onigiri Labo Co., Ltd.	November 2023	
23 special wards of Tokyo	Ginza Keizai Shimbun	Chūō, Tokyo Metropolis	Green Associates Co., Ltd.	April 2006	
23 special wards of Tokyo	Ichigaya Keizai Shimbun	Shinjuku, Tokyo Metropolis	Morshals Co., Ltd.	July 2007	
23 special wards of Tokyo	Ikebukuro Keizai Shimbun	Toshima, Tokyo Metropolis	YAKIMAYO Co., Ltd.	June 2010	
23 special wards of Tokyo	Itabashi Keizai Shimbun	Itabashi, Tokyo Metropolis	Raise Seed Co., Ltd.	August 2016	
23 special wards of Tokyo	Jiyūgaoka Keizai Shimbun	Shibuya, Tokyo Metropolis	JLOCAL Co., Ltd.	April 2007	
23 special wards of Tokyo	Katsushika Keizai Shimbun	Katsushika, Tokyo Metropolis	Seizu Co., Ltd.	July 2008	
23 special wards of Tokyo	Kita-Senju Keizai Shimbun	Adachi, Tokyo Metropolis	SOLPINO Co., Ltd.	June 2014	
23 special wards of Tokyo	Kōenji Keizai Shimbun	Suginami, Tokyo Metropolis	Hotwire Group Ltd.	July 2014	
23 special wards of Tokyo	Kōtō Keizai Shimbun	Kōtō, Tokyo Metropolis	Larry Bird Co., Ltd.	October 2014	
23 special wards of Tokyo	Kyōdō Keizai Shimbun	Setagaya, Tokyo Metropolis	Side Root LLC	August 2019	
23 special wards of Tokyo	Nakano Keizai Shimbun	Nakano, Tokyo Metropolis	Kikyō ICT Partners Co., Ltd.	October 2012	
23 special wards of Tokyo	Nerima Keizai Shimbun	Nerima, Tokyo Metropolis	Beagle Co., Ltd.	February 2012	
23 special wards of Tokyo	Nihonbashi Keizai Shimbun	Chūō, Tokyo Metropolis	Nihonbashi Keizai Shimbun	June 2010	
23 special wards of Tokyo	Nikotamagawa Keizai Shimbun	Setagaya, Tokyo Metropolis	Delight Co., Ltd.	March 2011	
23 special wards of Tokyo	Roppongi Keizai Shimbun	Minato, Tokyo Metropolis	Kiku Kaku Hanasu Co., Ltd.	April 2005	
23 special wards of Tokyo	Sangenjaya Keizai Shimbun	Setagaya, Tokyo Metropolis	Sancha Work Company Co., Ltd.	December 2013	
23 special wards of Tokyo	Shibuya Keizai Shimbun	Shibuya, Tokyo Metropolis	JLOCAL Co., Ltd.	April 2000	
23 special wards of Tokyo	Shimokitazawa Keizai Shimbun	Setagaya, Tokyo Metropolis	Bookstore B&B	August 2006	
23 special wards of Tokyo	Shinagawa Keizai Shimbun	Shinagawa, Tokyo Metropolis	Note Co., Ltd.	April 2007	
23 special wards of Tokyo	Shinbashi Keizai Shimbun	Chiyoda, Tokyo Metropolis	Goo-Choki-Partners Co., Ltd.	December 2006	
23 special wards of Tokyo	Shinjuku Keizai Shimbun	Shinjuku, Tokyo Metropolis	Crawl Co., Ltd.	April 2006	
23 special wards of Tokyo	Sumida Keizai Shimbun	Sumida, Tokyo Metropolis	Shanowa Co., Ltd.	December 2011	
23 special wards of Tokyo	Takadanobaba Keizai Shimbun	Shinjuku, Tokyo Metropolis	So-Hot Co., Ltd. (CASE Shinjuku)	August 2018	
23 special wards of Tokyo	Tokyo Bay Keizai Shimbun	Chūō, Tokyo Metropolis	Green Associates Co., Ltd.	March 2008	
Western Tokyo (Tama region)	Chōfu Keizai Shimbun	Chōfu, Tokyo Metropolis	Chofu City Regional Informatization Consortium (NPO)	September 2008	
Western Tokyo (Tama region)	Hachiōji Keizai Shimbun	Hachiōji, Tokyo Metropolis	Factorius LLC	April 2008	
Western Tokyo (Tama region)	Kichijoji Keizai Shimbun	Musashino, Tokyo Metropolis	Crawl Co., Ltd.	March 2006	
Western Tokyo (Tama region)	Nishitama Keizai Shimbun	Ōme, Tokyo Metropolis	Planet, Co., Ltd.	August 2011	
Western Tokyo (Tama region)	Sagamihara Machida Keizai Shimbun	Machida, Tokyo Metropolis	Machida City Tourism and Convention Association	August 2007	
Western Tokyo (Tama region)	Tachikawa Keizai Shimbun	Tachikawa, Tokyo Metropolis	Palette Co., Ltd.	March 2007	
Chūbu	Atami Keizai Shimbun	Atami, Shizuoka Prefecture	Conscious Management Co., Ltd.	October 2020	
Chūbu	Iida Keizai Shimbun	Iida, Nagano Prefecture	Iida FM Broadcasting Co., Ltd.	April 2024	
Chūbu	Izunokuni Keizai Shimbun	Izunokuni, Shizuoka Prefecture	qnote Co., Ltd.	April 2026	
Chūbu	Izu-Shimoda Keizai Shimbun	Shimoda, Shizuoka Prefecture	Izu Shimoda Keizai Shimbun Network (SNPO)	December 2022	
Chūbu	Kanazawa Keizai Shimbun	Kanazawa, Ishikawa Prefecture	Kanazawa Media Frontier	March 2007	
Chūbu	Kōfu Keizai Shimbun	Kōfu, Yamanashi Prefecture	Machizukuri Hojin Yamanashi Tank (NPO)	October 2023	
Chūbu	Matsumoto Keizai Shimbun	Matsumoto, Nagano Prefecture	Tanakara Co., Ltd.	September 2007	
Chūbu	Meieki Keizai Shimbun	Nagoya, Aichi Prefecture	Koogut Co., Ltd.	January 2006	
Chūbu	Toyota Keizai Shimbun	Toyota, Aichi Prefecture	FM Toyota Co., Ltd.	April 2021	

== Reception ==
The websites were praised by Taizo Shimonagi of BB Watch for covering local news in detail, adding that "it's full of news that's closely tied to the local community". Nobuko Masuda of Sankei Shimbun commented that in regional cities, the websites became "a tool that contributes to regional revitalization".

Although in its early years the reporters of the websites were subjected to suspicion due to a lack of recognition. By 2014, the websites received 10 million visits in total.
