= 28 (album) =

Studio album by Aoki Takamasa and Tujiko Noriko
- Released: August 18, 2005
- Recorded: 2002–2005
- Genre: Electronic
- Length: 46:03
- Label: Fat Cat

28 is an electronic music album by Aoki Takamasa and Tujiko Noriko, released on Fat Cat Records in 2005. Reviewers have compared Noriko's vocals and Takamasa's production to the Vespertine-era work of Björk and Matmos, with the track "Vinyl Words" particularly highlighted.

Professional ratings
Review scores
Source	Rating
Exclaim!	mildly favorable
Montreal Mirror	8/10
musicOMH	very favorable

== Track listing ==
No.	Title	Length
1.	"Fly2"	2:51
2.	"Vinyl Words"	5:28
3.	"When the Night Comes"	7:50
4.	"Doki Doki Last Night"	3:53
5.	"Fly Variation"	7:33
6.	"26th Floor"	7:07
7.	"Alien"	5:31
8.	"Nolicom"	5:50

== Production ==
All tracks written, performed, and produced by Takamasa and Noriko.

=== Equipment ===
- Mac PowerBook G4 1 GHz Laptop
- Neumann TLM 103 Microphone & MOTU 2408 Soundcard
- Korg Z1 Synthesizer
- Logic Pro 6.4.1 and Max/MSP 4.2.1 Software
