= Shibuya Hikarie =

Skyscraper and retail complex in Shibuya, Tokyo, Japan

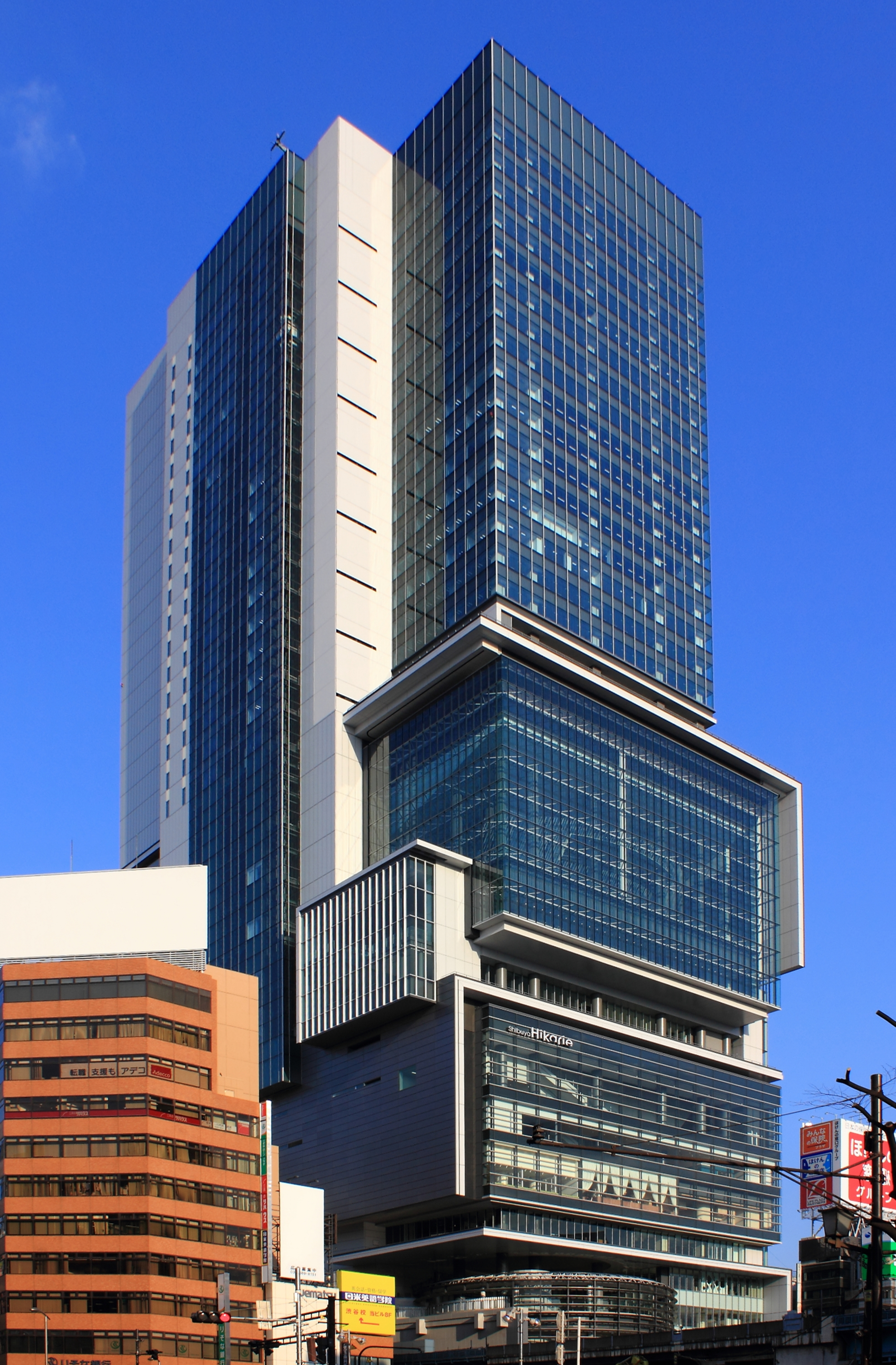
- Interactive map of the Shibuya Hikarie area

General information
- Location: Shibuya, Tokyo, Japan
- Coordinates: 35°39′32″N 139°42′12″E
- Construction started: 2009
- Completed: 2012

Height
- Roof: 180 m (590 ft)

Technical details
- Floor count: 33
- Floor area: 143,000m^2

Design and construction
- Developer: Tokyu Architects & Engineers joint venture Nikken Sekkei

Logo of Hishibuya Hikarie

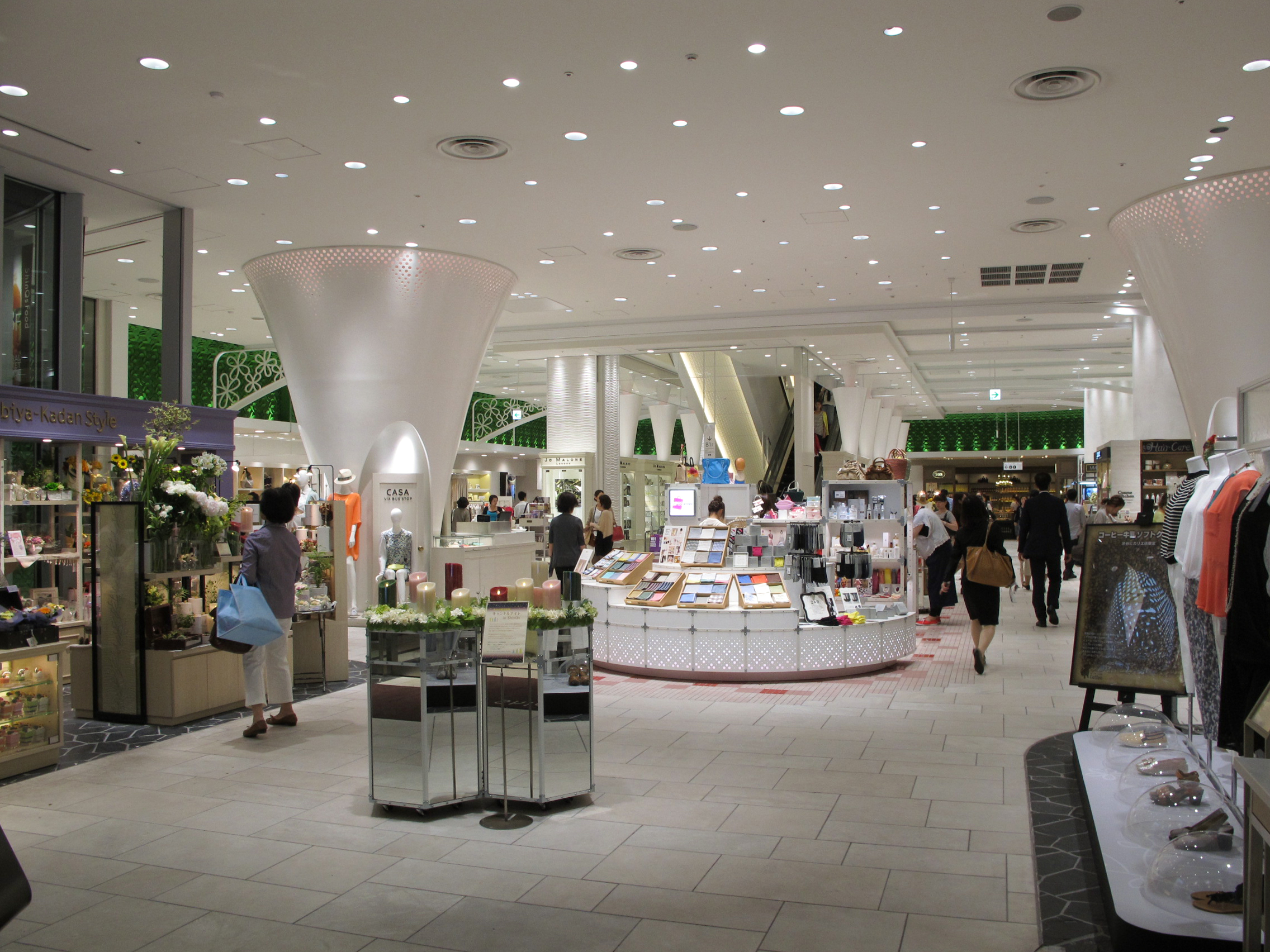
ShinQs Department Store

The Shibuya Hikarie (Japanese: 渋谷ヒカリエ) is a 183 meters tall, mixed-use building located near Shibuya station and owned by the Tokyu Group. As of November 2013, it was tied for being the 52nd tallest skyscraper in Japan and 40th tallest building in Tokyo.

Opened in April 2012 on a site formerly occupied by Shibuya Tokyu Bunka Kaikan, the Hikarie features extensive use of LED lighting and displays and combines shopping/dining/entertainment in similar ways to the Roppongi Hills project. Its profile and significance are partially due to being immediately proximate to Shibuya Station, to which it is connected by both a second-floor sky-walk and underground walkway.

Although it does not yet have the same cultural significance as the 109 Building, it is a prime retail and office destination. The public access floors (floors 1 - 11) are marked by glass-walling, allowing for views across Shibuya and Tokyo.

Shibuya Hikarie features retail sales and event space up to floor 11, at which point access is controlled to the Tokyu Theatre Orb (11-16) and private office space (17-34). Clients include KDDI and a number of headquarters for media companies.

== Pronunciation ==
Although the -rie ending is a feminine French ending correctly pronounced [ʁi] (approximately REE), and the use of French or faux French is common in Japanese lady's fashion, in this case the name of the building is a homophone for "toward the light" (Japanese: [çi̥kaꜜɾie] 光へ). The name was selected with the intention of evoking progressive thinking of Shibuya's future.

== Media coverage ==
The Hikarie has been featured by the national tourism agency and in popular culture and media. Tokyo Fashion Week is headquartered in this building, resulting in significant positive coverage in the domestic press. Foreign media have covered novel retail strategies, including the use of "themed floors" rather than the traditional retail division of men's fashion or women's sportwear.

== Gallery ==
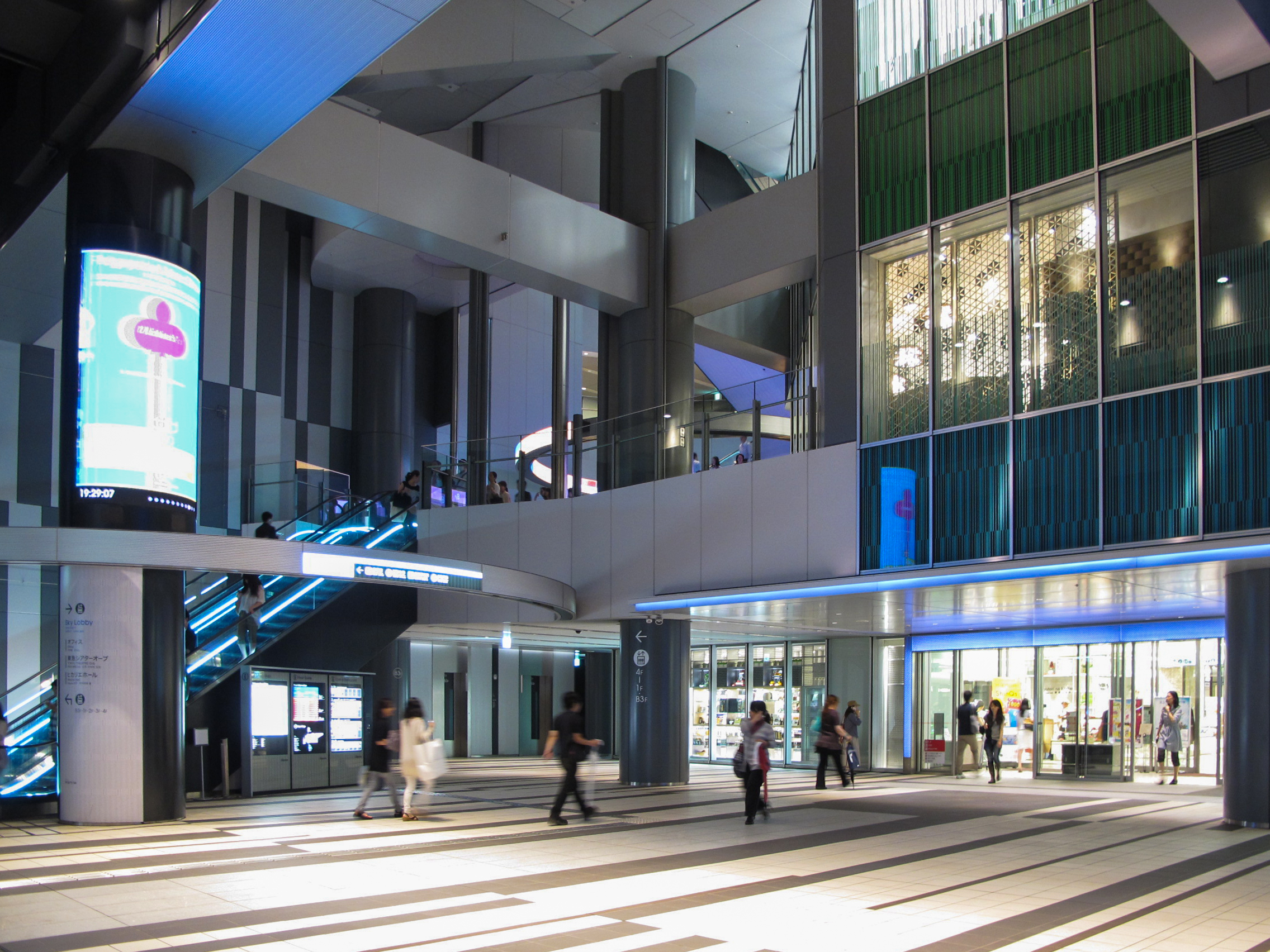
Basement

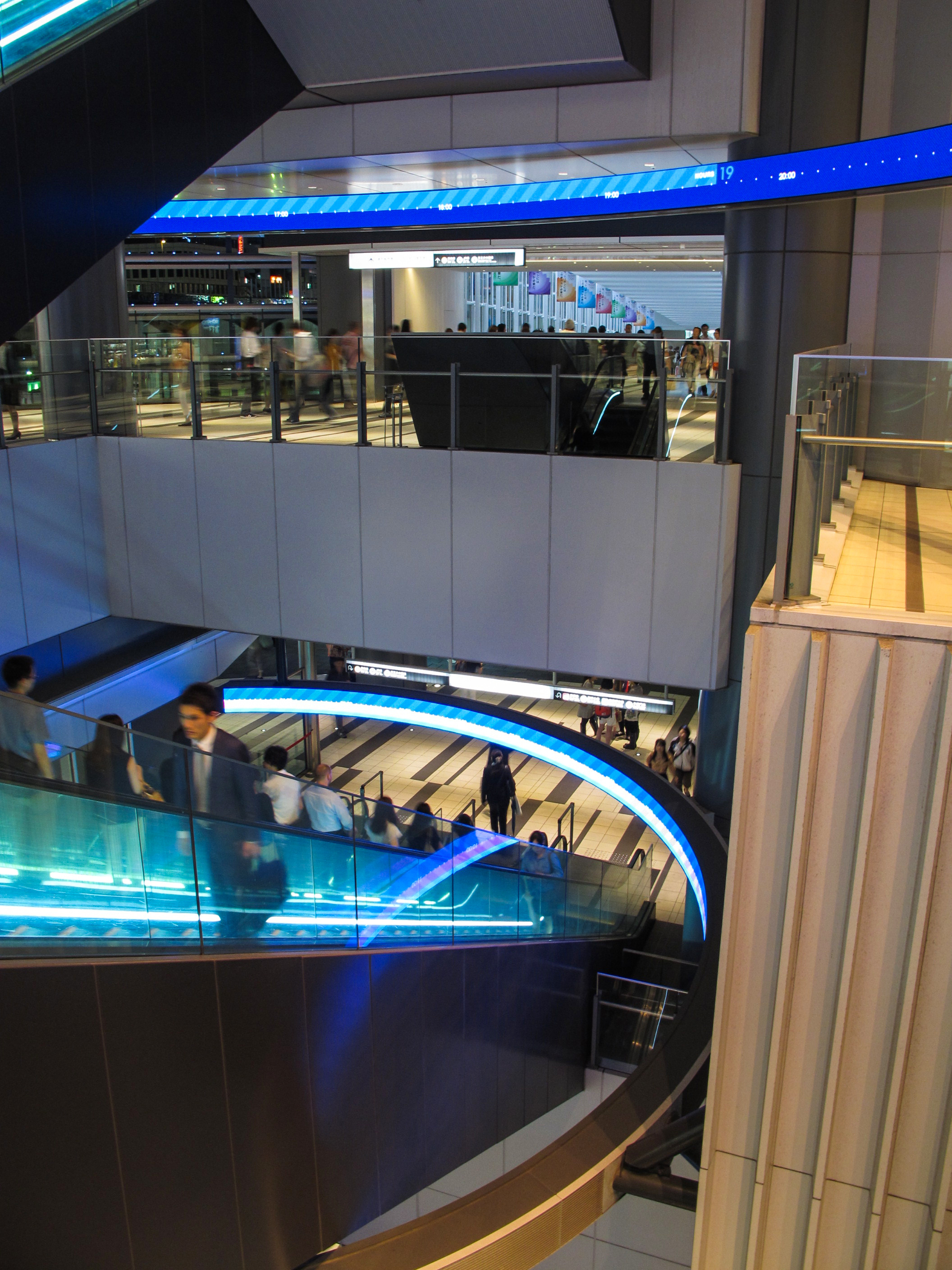
Urban Core atrium

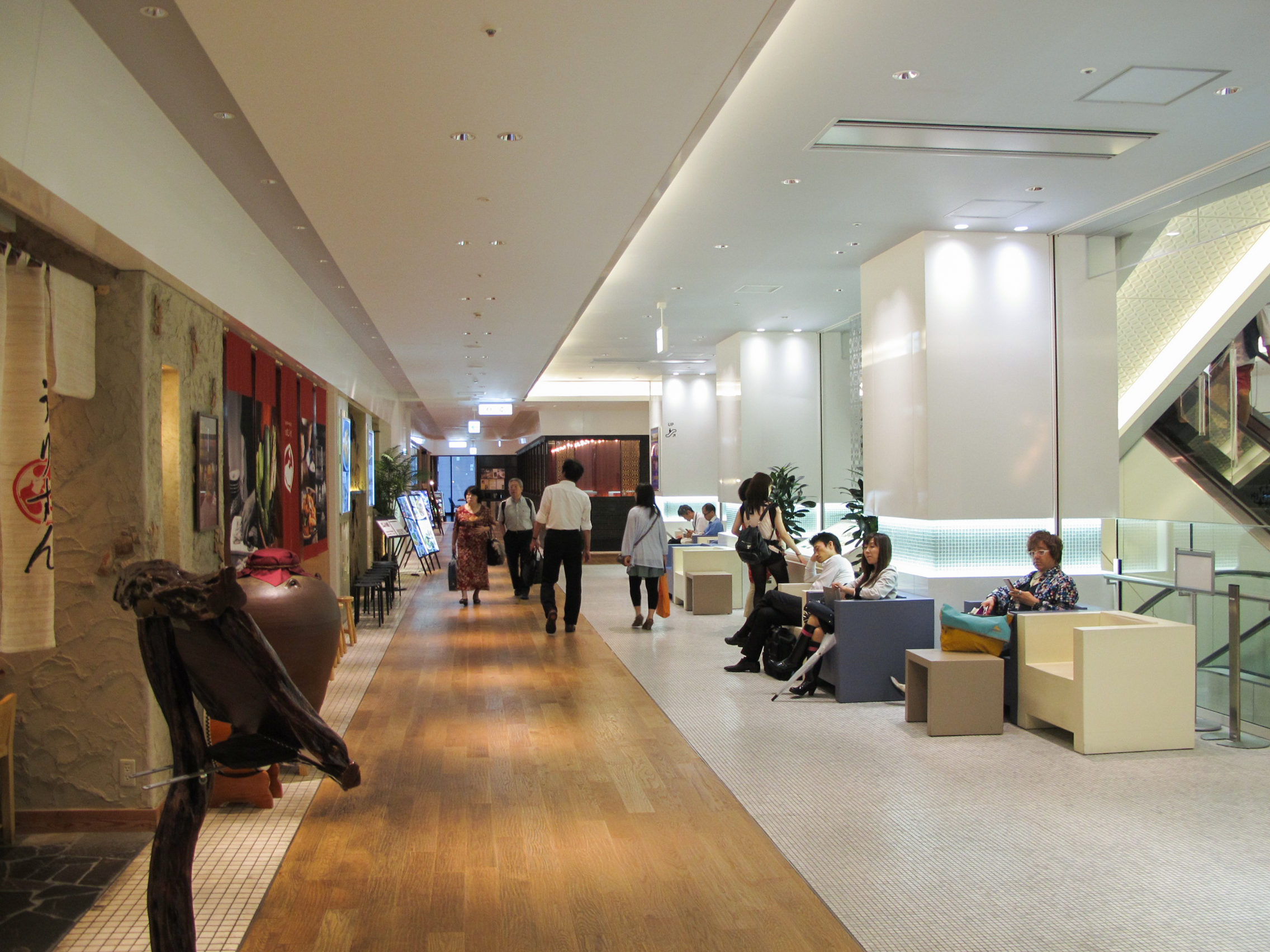
Dining6

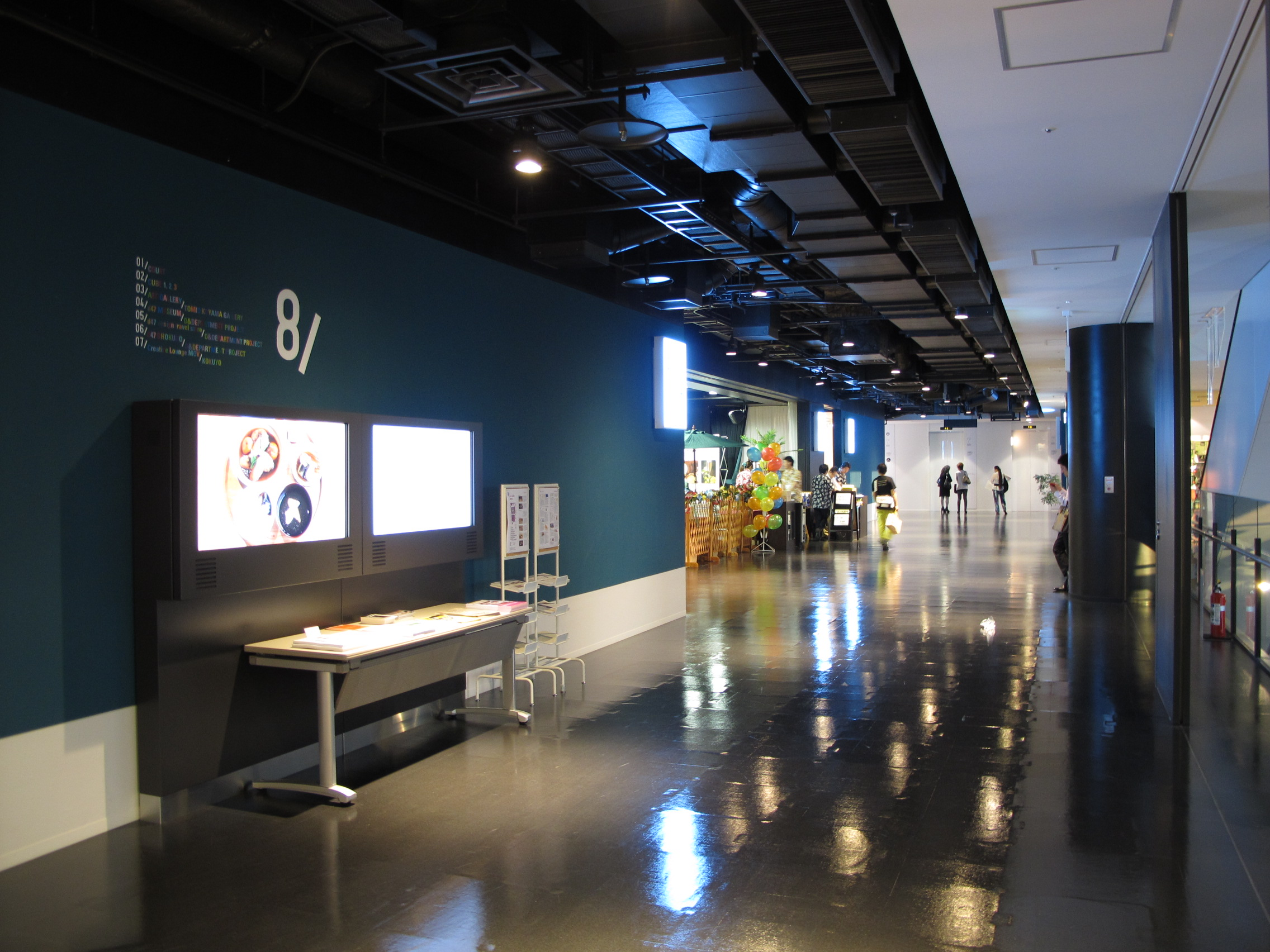
Creative Space 8

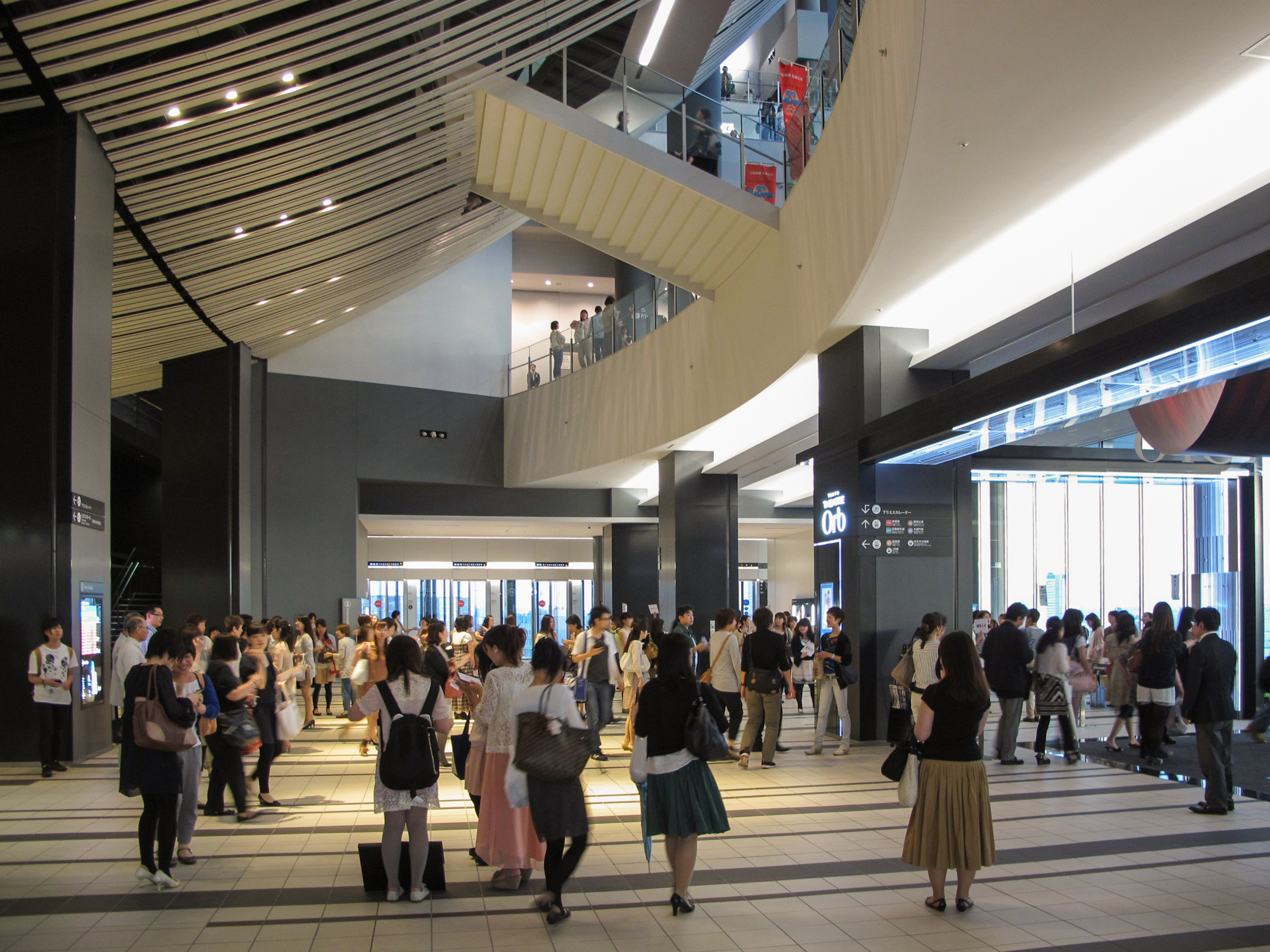
Tokyu Theatre Orb lobby

== See also ==
- Minna no Keizai Shimbun Network
