= Stroboscopic Artefacts =

German recording label

Strobosopic Artefacts
- Founder: Luca Mortellaro, also known as "Lucy"
- Genre: Techno, dub techno, electronica, ambient
- Country of origin: Germany
- Location: Berlin
- Official website: https://www.stroboscopicartefacts.com

Stroboscopic Artefacts is a recording label based in Berlin, Germany. It is owned and managed by Luca Mortellaro, better known by the production alias "Lucy." This record label is notable for releasing experimental techno and electronica to positive critical review.

The label also has a significant visual component, with a focus on album art and promotional videos created by the "Oblivious Artefacts" group, also known for their works with comparable techno labels such as Prologue.

== See also ==
- List of record labels
- List of electronic music record labels
