= Music (Sakanaction song) =

Single by Sakanaction

from the album Sakanaction
- Released: January 23, 2013
- Recorded: 2012
- Genre: Dance rock
- Length: 5:22
- Label: Victor Entertainment
- Songwriter: Ichiro Yamaguchi
- Producer: Sakanaction

Sakanaction singles chronology
| "Yoru no Odoriko" (2012) | "Music" (2013) | "Good-Bye" (2014) |

"Music" (Japanese: ミュージック, Hepburn: Myūjikku) (Japanese pronunciation: [mjɯ:ʑik:ɯ]) is a song by Japanese band Sakanaction. It was released as a single in January 2013, two months before the band's sixth album Sakanaction. A progressive dance rock song, "Music" was adopted as the theme song for the Yōsuke Eguchi-starring drama Dinner while the band's songwriter Ichiro Yamaguchi was struggling to write lyrics for the otherwise finished composition. Inspired by the cooking drama's theme of professionalism, Yamaguchi themed the song around his own experience with professionalism, relating it to his career as a musician. The band performed the song at several high-profile venues, including NHK's Music Station and at the 64th Kōhaku Uta Gassen New Year's musical competition.

Critics believed the composition was different structurally to a regular pop song, and challenged general notions about what constituted pop music, and was a high quality song, despite the single's apparent commercial-focus. Commercially, the song performed well, reaching number one on the Billboard Japan Hot 100 chart.

== Background and development ==
In September 2011, Sakanaction released their fifth studio album Documentaly, which had reached number two on the Japanese Oricon albums chart; the highest position achieved by the band in their career at the time. The album was strongly affected by the events of the 2011 Tōhoku earthquake and tsunami which had occurred in March of that year, during the promotional period for their single "Rookie". The band's vocalist and songwriter Ichiro Yamaguchi felt a new resolution to create music that would resonate with a general pop music audience, who listened to idol acts such as Girls' Generation and AKB48. As rock music was no longer a popular staple during the early 2010s in Japan, Yamaguchi felt that the reasons people listened to music had changed over time, and wanted to mix rock music with entertainment-focused music in order to give these people the type of music that they look for.

The band were contacted by the promotions team of Mode Gakuen to write a commercial song for their 2012 advertisements in October 2011, when the band had just begun performing their Sakanaquarium 2011 tour for Documentaly. This was the first time the band had been asked to write a piece of music specifically for a purpose (though songs on Documentaly had been used for commercial tie-ups, these had been organized after the songs had been completed). The band recorded the song after the tour finished, and planned to release it as a single at the beginning of 2012. However, while this was happening, the band were contacted to write a theme song for the Tsuyoshi Kusanagi drama 37-sai de Isha ni Natta Boku: Kenshui Junjō Monogatari, which disrupted their plans for the single. The theme song, "Boku to Hana", was released in May 2012, while the Mode Gakuen commercial "Yoru no Odoriko" was released in August 2012.

When Sakanaction had finished producing the music and arrangement of "Music", they were informed that the production staff from Fuji Television for the Yōsuke Eguchi-starring drama Dinner had requested a Sakanaction song for the drama's theme song. This, however, was before the song had been fully finished, while Yamaguchi was still writing the song's lyrics. As the offer was for any Sakanaction song, the band submitted a piece of music that they wanted to release for themselves, without considering the drama's story or the song's reception by television audience as they had done for "Boku to Hana". Originally the band did not plan to release "Music" as a single before the drama theme song offer, instead intending the song to act as the leading promotional track for their album Sakanaction (2013).

== Writing and inspiration ==
"Music" had the longest production time to date for a Sakanaction single, as Yamaguchi had difficulty finalizing the song's lyrics. Yamaguchi challenged himself to write the lyrics unconsciously, creating a story out of the lyrics that spontaneously occurred to him while listening to the song's melody. The first draft had a strong story to it, but Yamaguchi felt that because the story needed too much explanation to understand abandoned these plans. Yamaguchi wanted to write a song describing how Sakanaction as a band look toward music, and expressed musically what type of band Sakanaction were in that moment. While Yamaguchi was struggling with the song's lyrics, Sakanaction's manager gave them the news that one of their songs would be used for the theme song of the drama Dinner. As he was struggling to find a lyrical theme for the song, Yamaguchi read the screenplays for the first three episodes of the drama; finding professionalism to be an overarching theme to the work. Instead of relating the song to the drama's cooking-focused theme, Yamaguchi decided to write the song about his own professionalism, from his perspective as a musician.

For the arrangement, the band created "Music" by mixing together the "groove" of club music with kayōkyoku and rock genres. The band members recorded the song together with Yamaguchi at his apartment, instead of at a recording studio as they had done for "Boku to Hana" and "Yoru no Odoriko".

== Composition ==
"Music"
Aki Ito of EMTG felt that "Music"'s sound was intricate like sound art, and had a different structure and progression to a regular pop song.

"Music" is a five-minute and twenty-two second long composition that begins with a synthesizer-based rhythm paired with whispered vocals, which builds into a dance rock song. The initial verse is performed without Kusakari's bass guitar, which is added in the second verse.

== Promotion and release ==
The single was announced on December 1, 2012, when Yamaguchi was still recording the song at his home studio, while the song's usage as the theme song for Dinner was announced two weeks later. A ringtone of the song was released on January 13, the same day that the first episode of Dinner aired. Yamaguchi debuted the song in full the next day on his radio program Sakana Locks, a part of Tokyo FM's School of Lock. Composer Toshihiko Sahashi arranged two instrumental versions of the song for use as interstitial music in Dinner: a string version and a piano version. Both of these recordings were included on Dinner's original soundtrack, released on February 27.

On January 23, the song was released as a two-track single physical single. The release was sold for a reduced price of 500 yen and marketed as a "one coin single" (500 yen being the largest coin denomination in Japan), as a way to reach a wider audience and for more people to purchase physical copies. Yamaguchi himself did not like the "one coin single" moniker, feeling this implied that the single was a sub-par effort release, and pleaded with his management to stop referring to it with that term. "Music" was paired with the B-side "Eiga (Conté 2012/11/16 17:24)", a single take of the song "Eiga" that was recorded on November 16, 2012. This take was remixed and later included on Sakanaction two months later.

The band performed the song for the first time on the music program Music Station on February 15, and at the 64th Kōhaku Uta Gassen, NHK's annual New Year's music contest. Two performances of the song have been released in the band's video releases: one performance on the band's Sakanaquarium 2013 Sakanaction: Live at Makuhari Messe 2013.5.19 video album, and one on their Sakanatribe 2014: Live at Tokyo Dome City Hall video album.

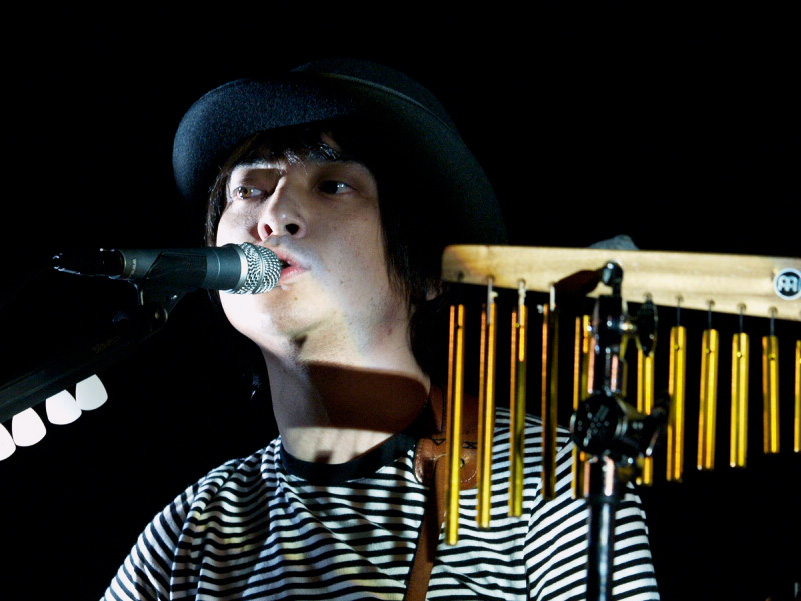
Electronic musician Cornelius remixed "Music" in 2014.

For the band's single "Sayonara wa Emotion" / "Hasu no Hana" (2014), electronic musician Cornelius remixed "Music" as one of the single's B-sides. Cornelius first met Yamaguchi while touring his Point album in 2001, when Yamaguchi was employed in the security team for his Sapporo concert. Originally the band asked Cornelius to remix a different song for the single, but he asked to remix "Music" instead, having grown to love the song as his son used to loudly play "Music" from his room when he was an elementary school student. Cornelius changed the melody's key and the chords to create an acoustic-based version from a dance and electronic-focused song, countering the standard way an acoustic song is remixed into an electronic form. This remix, alongside the single's B-side "Eiga (Conté 2012/11/16 17:24)", were included on the band's 2015 compilation album Natsukashii Tsuki wa Atarashii Tsuki: Coupling & Remix Works. Two weeks later, Cornelius released the remix as a part of his own compilation album, Constellations of Music. An additional remix of the song by Sakanaction's drummer Keiichi Ejima, "Music (Ej_Remix)", was also included on Natsukashii Tsuki wa Atarashii Tsuki: Coupling & Remix Works.

== Cover artwork ==
The cover artwork was produced by Kamikene of the design team Hatos. The artwork is based on his impressions of hearing an unfinished version of "Music" without the lyrics, as Yamaguchi found difficulty in completing the lyrics before the song's due date. It depicts two different gray-scale photographs separated by a bar. The cover art is actually a smaller, one tenth section of a hand-drawn poster made by Kamikene, who drew two artworks inspired by the song's sound. Instead of a single booklet, both artworks were included as a large-scale, folded poster for the physical single's first press edition. For the initial one-track digital download of the single, a similarly themed cover artwork was created, depicting separate photos to the standard edition.

== Music video ==
The music video was directed by Kazuaki Seki, who worked together with Sakanaction in 2010 for their single "Aruku Around". It was uploaded to YouTube two days after the single's release, on January 25, 2013. The music video features a square shot of Yamaguchi sitting down at a computer, while he listens to headphones. In the remaining area to the left and right of Yamaguchi, a video of a girl, played by talent Ayano Kudo, surrounded by gray-scale dancers can be seen as she goes about her daily life. The scenes of the girl switch between a top-down perspective and a forced perspective where it appears she is being shown from above, but is actually being shown from her side. Occasionally the dancer's black hands can be seen interacting with both the scenes of the girl and Yamaguchi's scene.

Entertainment Media Kulture described the video as inscrutable, believing the scenes of the girl to the left and right represented the music Yamaguchi is listening to.

== Reception ==
=== Critical reception ===
Aki Ito of EMTG felt that "Music" was a song that fought with general people's notions of what pop music is. She believed that the song was not simple to interpret and difficult to sing, but despite this was very catchy and memorable. She likened the song's arrangement to sound art in its intricacy, and believed the song had a different structure and progression to a regular pop song. Ito found "Music"'s melody interesting, as it was similar to classic mid-1990s dance music melodies, however slightly altered to create something entirely new. Entertainment Media Kulture felt that the song was a stoic look at how Sakanaction function as musical artists. CDJournal reviewers felt the chorus' echoing vocals and minimalistic development created a "floating feeling" and a "fantastic space", and that the song's final section left a "strong impact" created by the members working together in unison.

Dai Onojima was overwhelmed with the song's high quality and the "clear passion" of the lyrics, which caught him off guard due to the many commercially focused sales strategies Sakanaction's management had implemented for the single, including its drama tie-up, low price and tour pre-sales ticket inclusion. He felt that releasing a commercially focused song while singing about the reasons why they created music was a strong message about how dedicated they were as musicians.

=== Commercial reception ===
The single debuted at number four on Oricon's singles chart, with both Oricon and rival sales tracking agency SoundScan Japan tracking 35,000 physical copies sold in the single's first week. It remained in the top thirty singles for four weeks, and spent a total of ten weeks in the top 200 releases. The single fared better on the Billboard Japan Hot 100, which in January 2013 tracked physical sales, airplay and iTunes sales data. It reached number one on the chart, after receiving strong enough airplay a week prior to debut at number 15. On the iTunes Japan music store, the song was the 28th most purchased song of 2013.

== Track listings ==
Digital download
| No. | Title | Length |
|---|---|---|
| 1. | "Music" | 5:22 |
| Total length: | | 5:22 |

All tracks are written by Ichiro Yamaguchi.

Physical single, digital EP
| No. | Title | Length |
|---|---|---|
| 1. | "Music" | 5:22 |
| 2. | "Eiga (Conté 2012/11/16 17:24)" (映画 (コンテ 2012/11/16 17:24), "Film") | 5:06 |
| Total length: | | 10:30 |

== Personnel ==
Personnel details were sourced from Sakanaction's liner notes booklet.

Sakanaction

- All members – arrangement, production
- Keiichi Ejima – drums
- Motoharu Iwadera – guitar
- Ami Kusakari – bass guitar
- Emi Okazaki – keyboards
- Ichiro Yamaguchi – vocals, guitar, lyrics, composition

Personnel and imagery

- Minoru Iwabuchi – executive producer
- Kensuke Maeda – assistant engineer
- Tatsuya Nomura – executive producer (Hip Land Music Corporation)
- Tadashi Owaki – assistant engineer
- Yoriko Sugimoto – A&R director
- Satoshi Tajima – executive producer
- Ayaka Toki – assistant engineer
- Naoki Toyoshima – executive producer
- Masashi Uramoto – mixing, recording
- Satoshi Yamagami – A&R promoter
- Naoki Yokota – executive producer

Music video

- Ryuji Aigase – dancer
- Aoi Pro – production
- Aya Eguchi – dancer
- Daisuke Fukui – dancer
- Aiko Funaki – art
- Yuki Hamada – dancer
- Akira Hosoka – producer
- Hisashi "Momo" Kitazawa – creative director, stylist
- Ayano Kudo – cast member
- Asami Nemoto – hair, make-up
- Akiko Oodate – production manager
- Hayato Ōmori – dancer
- Shiho Sato – dancer
- Kazuaki Seki – director
- Itaru Shibamura – producer
- Kento Shimizu – production manager
- Yasuyuki Suzuki – lighting
- Yae Tomiyama – dancer
- Hiroyuki Yabe – camera
- Yūki Yada – dancer

== Chart rankings ==
| Charts (2013) | Peak position |
|---|---|
| Japan Billboard Adult Contemporary Airplay | 6 |
| Japan Billboard Japan Hot 100 | 1 |
| Japan Oricon daily singles | 3 |
| Japan Oricon weekly singles | 4 |

== Certification and sales ==
| Region | Certification | Certified units/sales |
|---|---|---|
| Japan (Oricon) (physical single sales) | — | 55,000 |
| Japan (RIAJ) | Platinum | 250,000^{*} |
Streaming
| Japan (RIAJ) | Platinum | 100,000,000^{†} |
^{*} Sales figures based on certification alone.^{†} Streaming-only figures based on certification alone.

== Release history ==
| Region | Date | Format | Distributing Label | Catalog codes |
|---|---|---|---|---|
| Japan | January 13, 2013 | Ringtone | Victor Entertainment | —N/a |
| Japan | January 14, 2013 | Radio add date | Victor Entertainment | —N/a |
| Japan | January 23, 2013 | CD single, digital download, rental CD | Victor Entertainment | VICL-36753, VICL-36754 |
| South Korea | February 20, 2013 | Digital download | J-Box Entertainment | —N/a |
