= Me ga Aku Aiiro =

Song by Sakanaction

from the album Kikuuiki
- Language: Japanese
- Released: March 10, 2010
- Recorded: 2010
- Genre: Progressive rock, rock opera
- Length: 6:55
- Label: Victor Entertainment
- Songwriter: Ichiro Yamaguchi
- Producer: Sakanaction

"Me ga Aku Aiiro" (Japanese: 目が明く藍色; "Eye-Opening Indigo") (Japanese pronunciation: [me ga akɯ aiiɾo]) is a song by Japanese band Sakanaction. It was the leading track from the band's fourth studio album Kikuuiki, released in March 2010.

== Background and development ==
The song was first written in 2001 by Ichiro Yamaguchi, while he was a member of his high-school band Dutchman. At the time he struggled to create a completed version of the song, feeling that the members of Dutchman could not actualize his vision for the song, and that such a song would make him seem conceited. The phrase me ga aku aiiro came to Yamaguchi in a dream when he was a teenager, where an unknown woman stood in front of him and chanted those words. Yamaguchi created the song as a seven-minute long rock opera suite, something the song had been even in the initial writing stages.

After deciding the theme of their fourth album would be mixing the unmixable, Yamaguchi remembered the song, and felt that this single song could explain the concept of the whole album. He decided that "Me ga Aku Aiiro" should be the leading promotional song off of the album, in order to display parts of Sakanaction the band did not show off on their dance-pop single "Aruku Around", to their new audience who had come to know them through the song. Even though Yamaguchi felt that his band Dutchman could not create the song in 2001, Sakanaction members were skilled enough to be able to complete the song. In particular, he was impressed with the band's bassist Ami Kusakari, who managed to create the vocal chorus section exactly as he imagined, despite him only giving her a rough demo. The string instrument and orchestral instrument recordings were recorded in two different sessions, with the orchestral instruments needing only a single take. Despite this, the song took up much more time than Yamaguchi had intended, with the band members only finishing the song on February 16, 2010, a month before the album's release. Yamaguchi found singing the lower notes of the song difficult, so in his place drummer Keiichi Eshima sings these low notes.

Yamaguchi wrote new lyrics to the song, and felt like the song mixed his past self with his present self. He inserted many lyrical gimmicks into the song's lyrics, such as hiding the album's title Kikuuiki in the lyric kimi no koe o kiku, iki o sutte (君の声を聴く 息を すって; "I hear your voice, you breathing"). This gimmick was the reason that Yamaguchi decided to capitalize the two central letters of the album title (kikUUiki). Yamaguchi felt that the lyrics he wrote were like a first-person novel, using lyrical techniques that he had not personally experimented with before. He wrote the lyrics abstractly, using words that meant a lot to Yamaguchi personally that would not mean anything to outside listeners. He hoped that this technique would move listeners, however without fully understanding why they felt moved.

The song was written considering how popular music consumers chose to listen to music in the early 2010s: by listening to samples on a purchasing page, or to ringtone versions of a song, and from there deciding if they like a song or not. Yamaguchi wanted to create a song that was hard to critically review due to its complexity, and that music consumers could not evaluate listening to a single sample. Yamaguchi wrote a song that was similar in style to songs in a Japanese school chorus competition: songs without a chorus but with multiple different verses. He made the first section begin with a kayōkyoku-inspired pop melody, so that the song could be understood by casual pop music listeners.

Yamaguchi felt that the song was a failure, because it did not bridge the gap between underground music listeners and listeners of popular music as he had wanted it to. Yamaguchi continued to use the lyrical techniques that he had utilised in "Me ga Aku Aiiro", which he saw as something people were more likely to empathise with. He used these on the next song that the band produced after "Me ga Aku Aiiro", "Identity" (2010), which was released as a single four months after "Me ga Aku Aiiro"'s release. After "Me ga Aku Aiiro"'s release, Sakanaction asked electronic musician Rei Harakami to create a remix of the song, as he had done for "Native Dancer", the leading track of their previous album, Shin-shiro (2009). However, Harakami could not find the time in his schedule to create it, before his death in July 2011.

== Promotion and release ==
The song was debuted on Japanese radio on February 22, on the Tokyo FM radio program School of Lock! In the week Kikuuiki was released, "Me ga Aku Aiiro" received enough radio airplay to debut at number 92 on the Billboard Japan Hot 100 chart. Three live versions of the song have been released by the band. The first was the performance during their Sakanaquarium 21010 "Kikuuiki" tour on their Sakanaquarium (C) (2011) video album, recorded at Shinkiba Studio Coast in Koto, Tokyo on May 15, 2010. The song is also featured on Sakanaquarium (B) (2011), a video album showcasing the band's Nippon Budokan concert held on October 8, 2010, and was the final performance of the second encore of the band's Sakanaquarium 2011 Documentaly tour.

== Music video ==
A music video was produced for the song, directed by Daisuke Shimada. Shimada was asked to direct the video by Hisashi "Momo" Kitazawa, the stylist who has worked with Sakanaction since "Sen to Rei" (2008), on Twitter. Shimada was inspired to depict the feelings of grief in a man losing his girlfriend; showing their changes in the past, present and future.

The video features 6,000 frames of stop-animation, which scroll vertically to indicate past and future. It begins showing a pale blue petal among tree branches, and objects against a pale background such as dolls, books and rocks that form the shape of an eye. During the choral section of the song, the images are of lights moving against a black background, followed by images of two overlapping blue circles, in the style of the Kikuuiki album cover artwork. After the third musical change, the video depicts objects on a pale background again. A book is shown being turned upside down, and the direction of the video changes from moving downwards to upwards. The stop-motion actions are shown being reversed, such as a stained-blue shirt losing its stain. A woman played by fashion model Lillian is shown lying on the ground, wearing an indigo dress and feet dyed blue. The final scene slowly zooms out, showing the woman as well as all of the objects from the earlier scenes in one single frame.

The video was uploaded by Victor Entertainment to YouTube on March 4, 2010, a week and a half before the release of the album.

== Critical reception ==
Takayuki Endoh of Skream! called "Me ga Aku Aiiro" "extremely wonderful", praising the song's incorporation of a wide variety of ideas.

== Personnel ==
Personnel details were sourced from Kikuuiki's liner notes booklet. Music video personnel details were sourced from Sakanarchive 2007—2011: Sakanaction Music Video Collection.

Sakanaction

- All members – arrangement, production
- Keiichi Ejima – drums
- Motoharu Iwadera – guitar
- Ami Kusakari – bass guitar
- Emi Okazaki – keyboards
- Ichiro Yamaguchi – vocals, guitar, lyrics, composition

Personnel

- Kiyoka Hasegawa – viola
- Fumiki Imaizumi – cello
- Tomoki Iwanaga – cello
- Naoko Kakutani – viola
- Satoshi Kamata – executive producer (Victor Records)
- Miwa Katayama – 1st violin
- Rinko Kishi – 2nd violin
- Junko Makiyama – 1st violin
- Junko Makiyama Strings – strings
- Hiroyuki Makimoto – executive producer (Victor Records)
- Yujiro Mitsugi – manager
- Mika Oi – 2nd violin
- Takako Ota – 2nd violin
- Miho Shimokawa – 1st violin
- Bin Tajima – executive producer (Hip Land Music Corporation)
- Yuzuru Tomita – string arrangement
- Masashi Uramoto – mixing, recording
- Tomoko Watanabe – 1st violin

Music video personnel

- Hisashi "Momo" Kitazawa – creative director, stylist
- Lillian – cast
- Asami Nemoto – hair, make-up
- Daisuke Shimada – director, producer
- Kazuhiro Yokobori – lighting
- Qotori film inc. – animation, production company, sound editing

== Chart rankings ==
Chart (2010)	Peak position
Japan Billboard Japan Hot 100	92

== Release history ==
Region	Date	Format	Distributing Label
Japan	February 22, 2010	radio add date	Victor Entertainment
Japan	March 10, 2010	ringtone, cellphone digital download	Victor Entertainment
