= Kikuuiki =

kikUUiki

Studio album by Sakanaction
- Released: March 17, 2010
- Recorded: 2009–2010
- Genres: Dance-rock, dub, ambient
- Length: 51:27
- Language: Japanese
- Label: Victor Entertainment
- Producer: Sakanaction

Sakanaction chronology
"Fish Alive" 30min., 1 Sequence by 6 Songs Sakanaquarium 2009 @ Sapporo (2009)	kikUUiki (2010)	Documentaly (2011)

Singles from Kikuuiki
- 1. "Aruku Around" Released: January 6, 2010

Kikuuiki (Mixing Airspace; stylized as kikUUiki, Japanese pronunciation: [ki̥kɯꜜːiki]) is the fourth studio album by Japanese band Sakanaction. It was released on March 17, 2010, through Victor Entertainment. In January, the album was preceded by the single "Aruku Around", which was met with the greatest commercial success for the band since their debut, reaching number three on Oricon's singles chart. The album was nominated as one of the finalists for the CD Shop Awards, and was lauded by critics for its cohesive sound and literary lyrics. At the time of release, it was their most commercially successful release since their debut, reaching number three in Japan.

Sakanaction spent most of 2009 experimenting on the album's single "Aruku Around", followed by two months of recording in January and February 2010. Most of the final recording stages were spent on the song "Me ga Aku Aiiro", a seven-minute rock opera used as a promotional single during its release. The album saw a new recording approach for the band, where the members worked more spontaneously and synchronized. The album was influenced by the commercial success of "Aruku Around", and was written as a response to the song.

== Background and development ==
After recording two studio albums in Sapporo, the band moved to Tokyo in spring 2009 to further their musical potential. Their first album produced in Tokyo, Shin-shiro (2009), saw a new approach for the band, where vocalist Ichiro Yamaguchi asked the other members of Sakanaction to arrange songs individually, instead of together. Led by the singles "Sen to Rei" and "Native Dancer", the album became their most commercially successful in their career, peaking at number eight on Oricon's album chart. Despite this, Yamaguchi was disappointed with the sales, and was not sure why the album stalled at 30,000 copies sold.

After the release of the album in January 2009, Sakanaction performed a two-month tour of Japan, Sakanaquarium 2009: Shinshiro. This was followed by appearances at many summer music festivals, including Sweet Love Shower, Nano-Mugen Fes, Rock in Japan and Rising Sun Rock Festival. On June 13, 2009, Sakanaction performed at Version 21.1, a newly created rock event by Sakanaction and the rock bands Ogre You Asshole and the Telephones to showcase rock music of the 2010s. On October 10, Sakanaction performed their first overseas concert, the Gentra X Ssamzie Sound Festival in Paju, South Korea.

Yamaguchi had started collecting ideas for Kikuuiki in February 2009, less than a month after the release of Shin-shiro. The band spent most of 2009 experimenting on the song "Aruku Around", and performed the song at their summer festival appearances at Rock in Japan and Rising Sun Rock Festival, to see how the audience would react to the song's different approach. After "Aruku Around" was released as a single in January 2010, it became a commercial and critical success. It reached number three on Oricon's single charts, and was praised for its strong arrangement and Yamaguchi's poetic lyrics. The single's success surprised the band, who never considered it could become as popular as it did.

== Writing and production ==
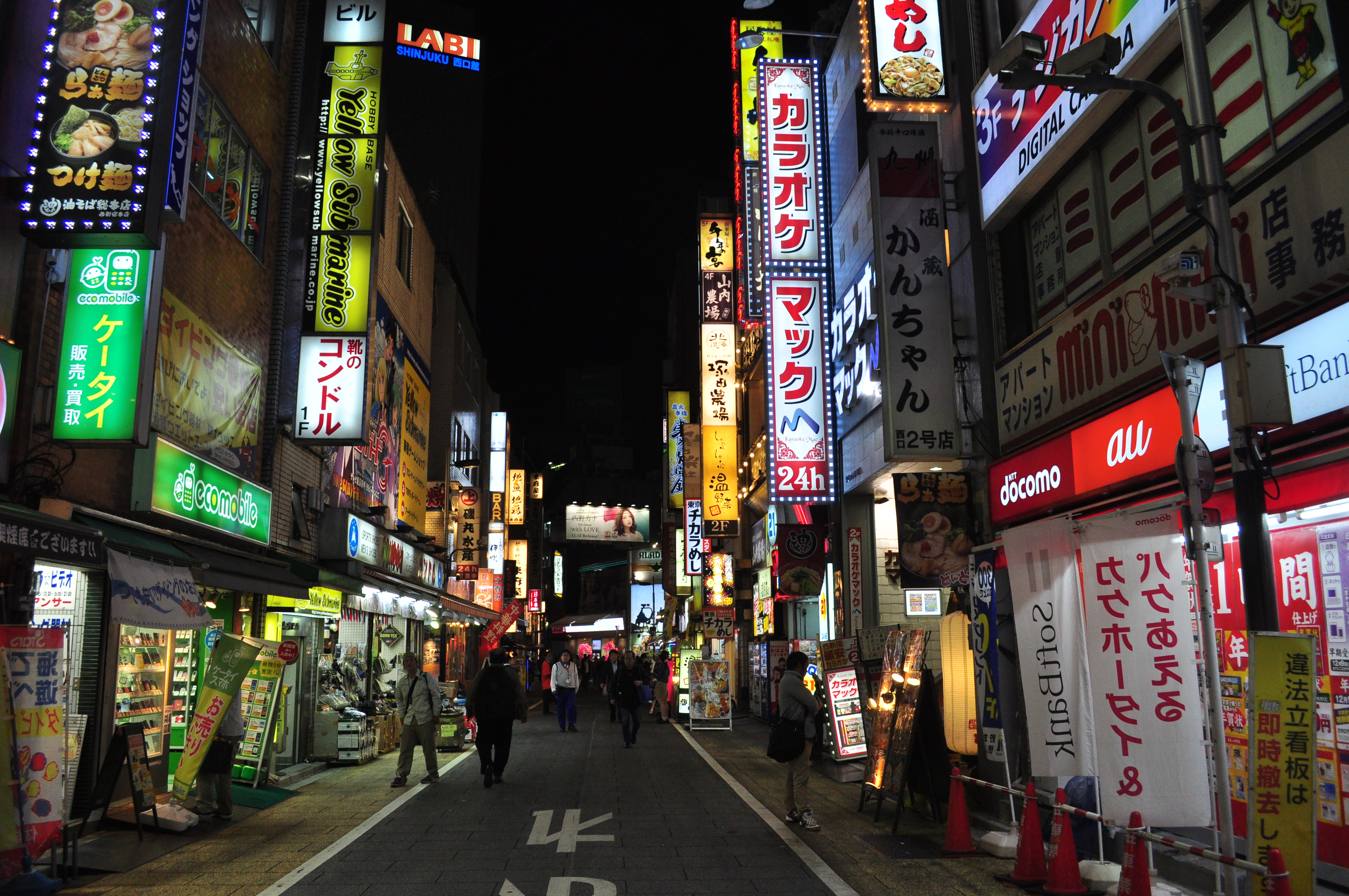
The album was primarily recorded in Shinjuku, Tokyo, in January and February 2010.

The album was primarily recorded at Freedom Studio in Shinjuku, Tokyo, with secondary recording sessions held at Sound Arts, Avaco Creative Studio and Galva Studio, all in Tokyo, as well as Studio Wakefield in Tama-ku, Kawasaki. Recording sessions for "Aruku Around" were held in 2009, while the bulk of the album was recorded in January and February 2010. The recording sessions finished on February 16, a month before the album's release date. The writing process took longer than expected and the band had to postpone the album four times from their intended finishing date, mostly due to the complexities of recording the seven minute long song "Me ga Aku Aiiro".

The Kikuuiki album sessions were influenced by the commercial success of "Aruku Around", where the band considered what sorts of songs they wanted to make, and what sort of music they should present to their new audience for the audience to understand what songs Sakanaction create other than "Aruku Around"-style ones. The band did not want to make an album full of songs identical to "Aruku Around", and instead wanted to express to their listeners the breadth of musical inspirations that they could mix together. Yamaguchi felt that it was important to not release a second similar song immediately after "Aruku Around", as he saw that music consumers in the 2010s were acting as critics on their own Mixi or Twitter accounts. For these people, he believed it was important to exhibit different aspects of the band. He felt this was important for growing Sakanaction as a band, to break the cycle of a musical act becoming popular, then continuing to release the same style of music that made them popular until people grew tired of them. Even before the single's success, the band planned to feature songs on the album that would go against listeners expectations of what Sakanaction was as a band. On the other hand, the band attempted to keep a commercial sound, the same goal of Shin-shiro, or else they felt that their efforts would have been wasted. This led the band trying to create pop art music, blending art with commercialism.

The creation process for Kikuuiki was different to that of Shin-shiro, where each member worked alongside Yamaguchi in a two-person meeting, and later working on the songs together as a band. For Kikuuiki, Yamaguchi recorded each song's demo, then in a meeting the band would discuss the song's feel and emotions, listing everything on a white board. Yamaguchi would then leave the other four band members to work on the song together, while he worked on their next song. Afterwards, he would return to the studio and make suggestions on their progress on the first song. This meant that Yamaguchi had less input on Kikuuiki than on the band's previous albums, which made him feel more like the band's producer. The lessened input made Yamaguchi feel that he had come to trust each member's musical abilities much more than before. On previous albums, the members needed to compromise or give up on ideas that they had, however on Kikuuiki they found that they understood each other much better. This led to the members expressing themselves more, such as drummer Keiichi Ejima, who showcased his taste in rock music strongly in the sound he created for the album. Many songs were still being created when they were recording, unlike previous albums where songs were entirely finished before recording the final take. This meant that many spontaneous ideas were included on the album. An example of this was the band wanted to add a chorus, they collected together all the people who happened to be in the studio at the time, including their musical director. The spontaneous process led to the song "Klee", written about the paintings of Swiss-German painter Paul Klee, to be recorded in a single take. Similarly, the song "Coelacanth to Boku" was inspired by the atmosphere of Yamaguchi's room as the album was being created. Instead of featuring repeating sounds on the album, Sakanaction decided to carefully consider how each sound-effect effected the song, and included very few repeating sounds.

The album's title Kikuuiki (汽空域, Kikūiki) is a word coined by Yamaguchi. It is related to the term kisui'iki (汽水域), a term describing the brackish water around river heads, where fresh water and salt water mix together. Yamaguchi replaced the character referring to water with the character referring to sky, applying the concept to mixing air instead. This phrase is used to represent the album's theme: mixing the unmixable. This idea related to how each member had completely different music tastes, but somehow were able to create music together. Similarly, it related to the idea of how Sakanaction as a band mixed rock, club and folk music, but were able to blend different tastes to find an equilibrium that a wide range of people would like. The band created the song "Me ga Aku Aiiro" as a song that would represent the album's theme in a single song. The album's introduction, a mix of recordings taken by Yamaguchi on his iPhone at the recording studio, was similarly created to match this theme.

The album was influenced by the changing mediums people listen to music in the 2000s and 2010s: how people used their cellphones or YouTube to discover new music. Yamaguchi wanted to create songs that were difficult to evaluate by listening to just a sample of the song. The seven minute long "Me ga Aku Aiiro" in particular was written with such music consumers in mind. The band also felt influenced by the city of Tokyo, after living in the city for a year and a half and deciding to call it their permanent home. Retrospectively, Yamaguchi saw Shin-shiro as depicting the band as they had arrived in Tokyo, while Kikuuiki showed the versions of themselves that they had discovered by living in Tokyo.

After recording Shin-shiro, the band had many opportunities to meet other bands that performed similar music to them, because they were now based in Tokyo. In particular, Yamaguchi felt influenced by Yūsuke Koide of Base Ball Bear, impressed that Koide's lyrics managed to express himself as himself, despite their fictional nature. Yamaguchi wrote his first fiction song because of this, "Omotesandō Nijūroku-ji", as a challenge for himself, and to match the mixing theme of Kikuuiki. Yamaguchi took further inspiration from the Shōwa period in Japan during its asset price bubble when writing "Omotesandō Nijūroku-ji". The song "Ushio" was one of the first compositions written for the album. Yamaguchi decided to place it as the first song on the album, as he felt it was similar to the material found on Shin-shiro, as a way to show off what sort of band Sakanaction were up until the release of "Aruku Around". The song mixed a heavy lyrical theme of whether personal philosophies arise from a person's community or from within themselves, with a psychedelic, avant garde pop sound.

Yamaguchi found the Kikuuiki recording sessions exhausting, as if he had used all of his energy in the writing process. In an interview with Rockin' On Japan in 2011, Yamaguchi felt that the people who became fans during this period became Sakaction's core fanbase. Because of this, many of Sakanaction's concert set-lists continue to feature songs from Kikuuiki for these people.

== Cover artwork ==
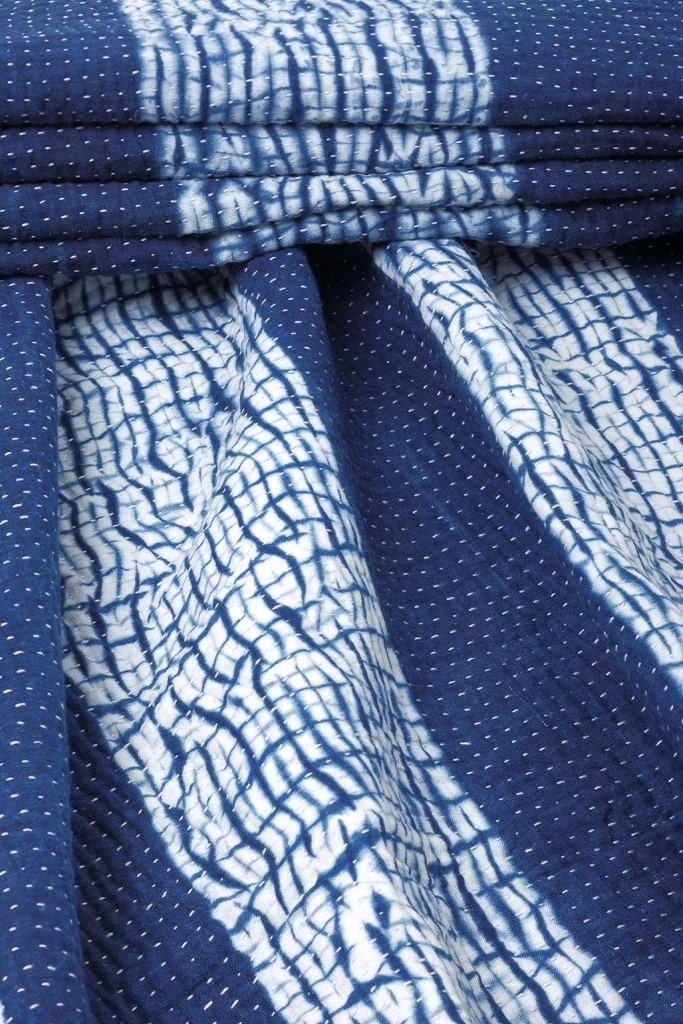
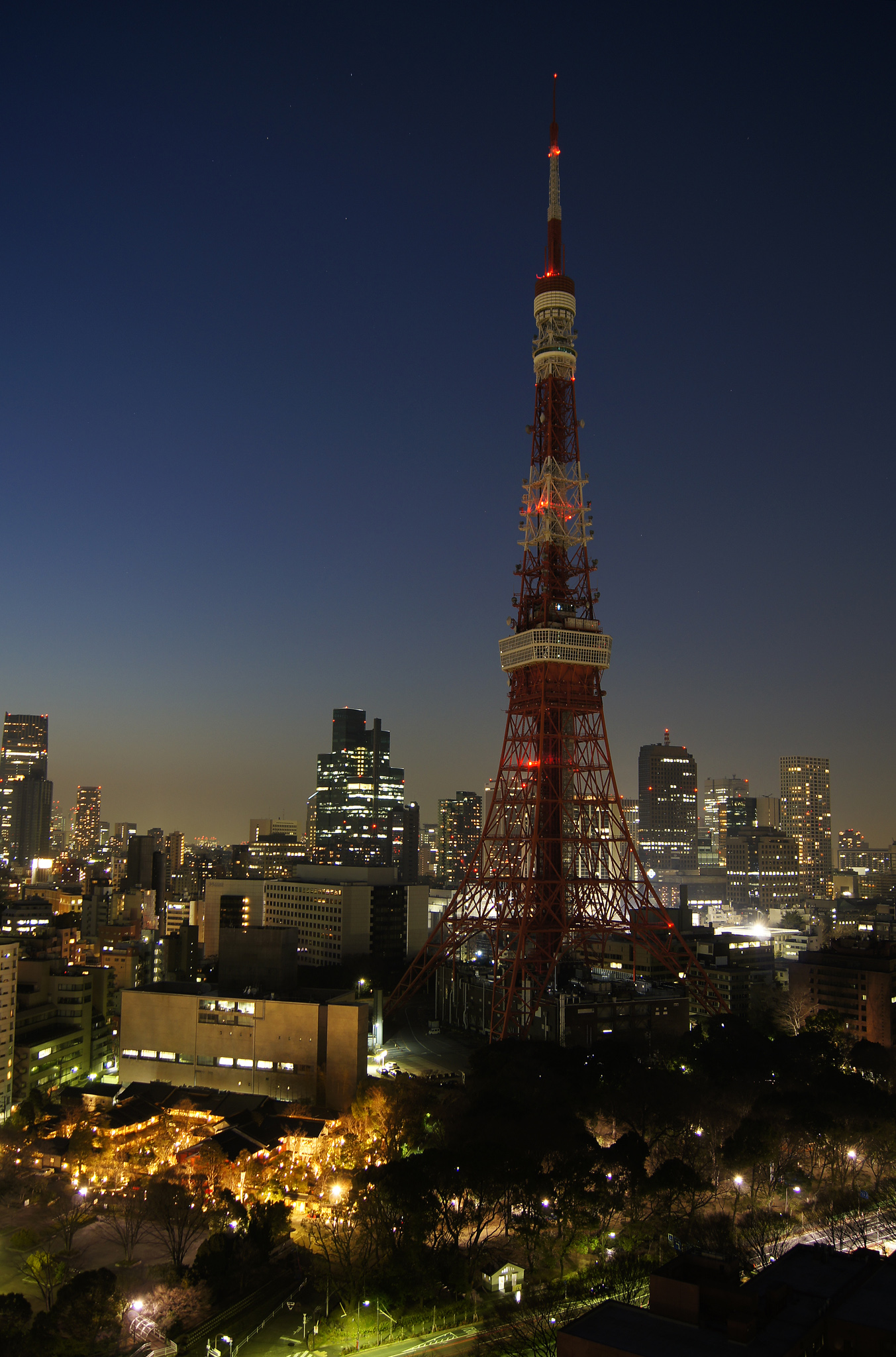
The blue colors of the album artwork were inspired by synthetic aiiro dye (left) and the pre-dawn sky (right).

The album's artwork was created by Kamikene and Daisuke Ishizaka of Hatos. It features two overlapping circles colored deep blue and bright blue, in order to create aiiro (藍色), a color close to indigo. The bright blue was chosen as it was a synthetic ink that regularly occurs in Japanese printing, while the deep blue was taken naturally, isolating a color taken from a photo of the sky just before dawn. The center of the artwork features the Kikuuiki typography, as well as a logo of two overlapping circles. The mix of natural and artificial blue circles was used to represent Kikuuiki's theme of mixing points.

== Promotion and release ==
Kikuuiki's release was announced in mid-January 2010, after the release of the single "Aruku Around". On March 10, the song "Me ga Aku Aiiro" was released as a digital download to cellphones in Japan, as well as ringtones of all of the tracks on the standard edition of the album. The song was the lead promotional track on the album, and received enough radio airplay to reach number 92 on the Billboard Japan Hot 100 chart.

To promote the album, the band made the album's songs available for listening on their website between February 24 and 28. The songs were only available from 4:00-5:30am Japan Standard Time, during what they dubbed kikuuiki time. Each listener could randomly listen four or five songs. The whole album was made available for listening on March 1. The band held a listening party at Liquid Loft in Shibuya, Tokyo on March 13, which was simulcast on the video streaming website Ustream. The album was released in two editions–limited and standard. The limited edition features a bonus track, "Paradise of Sunny", which is a dub remix of the song "Yes No", remixed by recording engineer Sachio "Sunny" Sasaki.

The band performed a thirteen-date national tour of Japan in April and May, dubbed the Sakanaquarium 2010 Kikuuiki. The final two dates were held at the 2,000 capacity Zepp Sapporo concert hall on May 8, followed by the 2,400 capacity Shinkiba Studio Coast in Koto, Tokyo. Footage of seven songs performed at Shinkiba Studio Coast on May 15 were made available as iTunes downloads in August 2010. The band followed up this tour with their first concert at the Nippon Budokan stadium. The Shinkiba Studio Coast and Nippon Budokan concerts were released on DVD in 2011. The album was re-released on March 25, 2015, as a lossless digital download. This was followed by an LP record edition on August 5, 2015, to coincide with the release of the band's compilation album Natsukashii Tsuki wa Atarashii Tsuki: Coupling & Remix Works.

== Reception ==
=== Commercial reception ===
On Oricon's physical albums charts, the album debuted at number three with 29,000 copies sold, behind One Piece Memorial Best, an album compiling theme songs from the anime One Piece, and pop/jazz singer Juju's third album Juju. SoundScan Japan, another sales tracking agency, found that most copies were of the album's limited edition, with 27,000 copies sold in the first week. The album spent an additional three weeks in the top 50, and left the top 300 after thirteen weeks. After the release of the band's "Identity" single in August, the album charted for an additional six weeks. In 2011, the album had two more chart runs in the top 300: one in April after the release of their single "Rookie", and one in August after the release of "Bach no Senritsu o Yoru ni Kiita Sei Desu.". These four chart runs resulted in the album selling a total of 59,000 copies in two years. Despite the album being the band's most successful release up to that moment, Yamaguchi was disappointed with the album sales, as he expected it to sell over 100,000 copies.

=== Critical reception ===
"Aruku Around"
Critics praised the synths, melody and beat of "Aruku Around".

"Yes No"
The introduction of dub influences in songs such as "Yes No" were praised by critics.

The album was well received by Japanese music critics, and was chosen as one of the eleven finalists for the 2011 CD Shop Awards. Toshitomo Doumei of Skream! named the album his third favorite of 2011, feeling that the album had simultaneously created new genres of alternative rock and pop music. He felt the album's music was catchy, and that its success was expected due to its high quality. Entertainment Media Kulture called Kikuuiki the album that established Sakanaction's current style. Yuji Tanaka of CDJournal felt the album was more cohesive than their previous works, praising the band's skill progression and Yamaguchi's lyrics, which he described as "literary-style" and "cynical". He was struck by the "heroic march" after the album's introduction in the song "Ushio", which made him feel "suddenly intoxicated ... like being in the ocean". Takayuki Endoh of Skream! similarly believed the album showed growth in the band. Although their previous releases incorporated dance and rock music, Endoh felt that the music on Kikuuiki had struck a better harmony between the two, and had simultaneously become more rock and dance–oriented. He praised the album's "poppy floating feeling, highly literary lyrics, and romantic electro sound", feeling that the band was unique in the music industry.

Koji Dejima of Bounce felt that the album was ingenious in the way that it created a feeling of being out of place due to its arrangements, melodies and lyrics. He praised the album's varied sound, and the fact that the band always "spoke with their own words" despite this variety of sound. He noted "Aruku Around"'s strong dance music sound, and likened "Klee" to the songs of The Police, and "Omotesandō Nijūroku-ji" to the music of the 1970s American band Television. Rolling Stone Japan gave the album four stars out of five, praising the Yamaguchi's "literary and original" lyrics, and how human the music sounded despite its electronic sound. Kaori Komatsu of Rockin' On Japan felt that Yamaguchi's lyrics created an "interesting feeling of unease" and had a "deep flavor". She noted that Yamaguchi's lyrics often described everyday life and his mental space, layered on top of each other in impressionist scenes. She felt that the band's sound had become more ambitious in their genre crossovers, especially the inclusions of ambient music and dub elements, and that the songs had a "sense of city", much stronger since they had moved to Tokyo. Tanaka of CDJournal noted similar qualities in the songs "Yes No" and "Ashita kara", which to him expressed the loneliness of city life.

The album's lead single "Aruku Around" was well received by music critics. CDJournal reviewers gave the single its star of recommendation, calling it a "killer tune" where the "pleasure of living in the moment" and "prudence" is balanced. They noted the song's retro sound, like nostalgic dance music, and felt that the band's decision to move to Tokyo two years ago was reflected in the song. Kenji Sasaki of Skream! felt that the song had a "gentle electronica feel", praising the 1980s-style synths, aggressive sound and "unique poetic sentiment" of Yamaguchi's. He also praised the emotions the song gave him, mixing pain and exhilaration. Tomoki Takahashi of Rockin' On Japan felt the greatest strength of the song was how its lyrical content jarred with its "high-spirited words" and "explosive hybrid beat". He noted that instead of talking about the pleasures of the dance floor, Yamaguchi's lyrics were introspective, discussing loneliness, pain and longing. Takahashi praised the brave fanfare-like synth based leading melody, and the "tight" and "earth-shaking" four on the floor beat.

== Track listing ==
All lyrics are written by Ichiro Yamaguchi.

No.	Title	Music	Length
1.	"Intro = Kikuuiki" (汽空域, "Mixing Airspace")	Sakanaction	0:53
2.	"Ushio" (潮, "Tides")	Yamaguchi, Motoharu Iwadera	5:20
3.	"Yes No"	Yamaguchi	3:57
4.	"Aruku Around" (アルクアラウンド Aruku Araundo, "Walk Around")	Yamaguchi	4:23
5.	"Klee"	Yamaguchi	4:16
6.	"21.1" (Tuentī Wan Dotto Wan)	Sakanaction	4:04
7.	"Under" (アンダー Andā)	Yamaguchi	4:35
8.	"Coelacanth to Boku" (シーラカンスと僕 Shīrakansu to Boku, "The Coelacanth and I")	Yamaguchi	5:10
9.	"Ashita kara" (明日から, "From Tomorrow")	Yamaguchi	4:02
10.	"Omotesandō Nijūroku-ji" (表参道26時, "Omotesandō 2:00am")	Yamaguchi	4:16
11.	"Kabe" (壁, "Wall")	Yamaguchi	3:36
12.	"Me ga Aku Aiiro" (目が明く藍色, "Eye-opening Indigo")	Yamaguchi	6:55
Total length:			51:27

Limited edition bonus track
No.	Title	Music	Length
13.	"Paradise of Sunny"	Sakanaction	6:17
Total length:			57:44

== Personnel ==
Personnel details were sourced from Kikuuiki's liner notes booklet.

Sakanaction

- All members – arrangement, production, composition (tracks 1, 6, 13)
- Keiichi Ejima – drums
- Motoharu Iwadera – guitar, composition (track 2)
- Ami Kusakari – bass guitar
- Emi Okazaki – keyboards
- Ichiro Yamaguchi – vocals, guitar, lyrics, composition (tracks 3–5, 7–12)

Personnel and imagery

- Takeshi Akiba – assistant engineer for Galva Studio
- Kiyoka Hasegawa – viola (track 12)
- Fumiki Imaizumi – cello (track 12)
- Daisuke Ishizaka – photography
- Tomoki Iwanaga – cello (track 12)
- Naoko Kakutani – viola (track 12)
- Yoshinori Kashiwagura – assistant engineer for Avaco Creative Studio
- Satoshi Kamata – executive producer (Victor Records)
- Kamikene – artwork design
- Miwa Katayama – 1st violin (track 12)
- Nami Katsuno – management desk (Hip Land Music Corporation)
- Rinko Kishi – 2nd violin (track 12)
- Mikio Koike – coordination
- Yuka Koizumi – mastering
- Yusuke Maeda – assistant engineer for Freedom Studio
- Junko Makiyama – 1st violin (track 12)
- Junko Makiyama Strings – strings (track 12)
- Hiroyuki Makimoto – executive producer (Victor Records)
- Yujiro Mitsugi – manager
- Yuki Nanjo – 2nd violin (track 12)
- Tatsuya Nomura – A&R producer (Hip Land Music Corporation)
- Sokkun Oh – assistant engineer for LSD Engineering (track 13)
- Mika Oi – 2nd violin (track 12)
- Takako Ota – 2nd violin (track 12)
- Tomoko Sato – management desk (Victor Entertainment)
- Kazuo Saito – assistant engineer for Sound Arts
- Sachio "Sunny" Sasaki – dub remix (track 13)
- Akira Sekiguchi – A&R director
- Miho Shimokawa – 1st violin (track 12)
- Shiho Suzuki – merchandiser
- Bin Tajima – executive producer (Hip Land Music Corporation)
- Masahiro Tamoto – assistant engineer for Sound Arts
- Toshiya Tatebe – sales promoter
- Yuzuru Tomita – cooperative keyboard arrangement (tracks 4, 9), string arrangement (track 12)
- Masashi Uramoto – mixing, recording
- Tomoko Watanabe – 1st violin (track 12)
- Wataru Woka – sales promoter
- Satoshi Yamagami – A&R promoter
- Daisuke Yamamoto – assistant engineer for Freedom Studio
- Satoshi Yoneda – assistant engineer for Avaco Creative Studio

== Charts and sales ==
Chart (2010)	Peak position
Japan Billboard Top Albums Sales	4
Japan Oricon daily albums	2
Japan Oricon weekly albums	3

=== Sales ===
Chart	Amount
Oricon physical sales	59,000

== Release history ==
Region	Date	Format	Distributing Label	Catalogue codes
Japan	March 17, 2010	CD, limited edition CD, digital download	Victor Entertainment	VICL-63556, VICL-63557
South Korea	March 23, 2010	digital download	J-Box Entertainment	—N/a
Taiwan	April 9, 2010	CD	Rock Records	GUT2307
Japan	March 18, 2015	lossless digital download	Victor	VEAHD-10617
Japan	August 5, 2015	LP record	Victor	VIJL-60151~2
