= Native Dancer (disambiguation) =

Native Dancer (1950–1967) was a famed race horse.

Native Dancer may also refer to:

- Native Dancer (album), a 1974 album by Wayne Shorter
- "Native Dancer" (song), a 2009 song by Japanese band Sakanaction
