= Noborito Research Institute =

Imperial Japanese Army research institute

Coordinates: 35.61131°N 139.547035°E

Army Ninth Technical Research Institute
- 第9陸軍技術研究所 (Dai-kyū Rikugun Gijutsu Kenkyūjo)
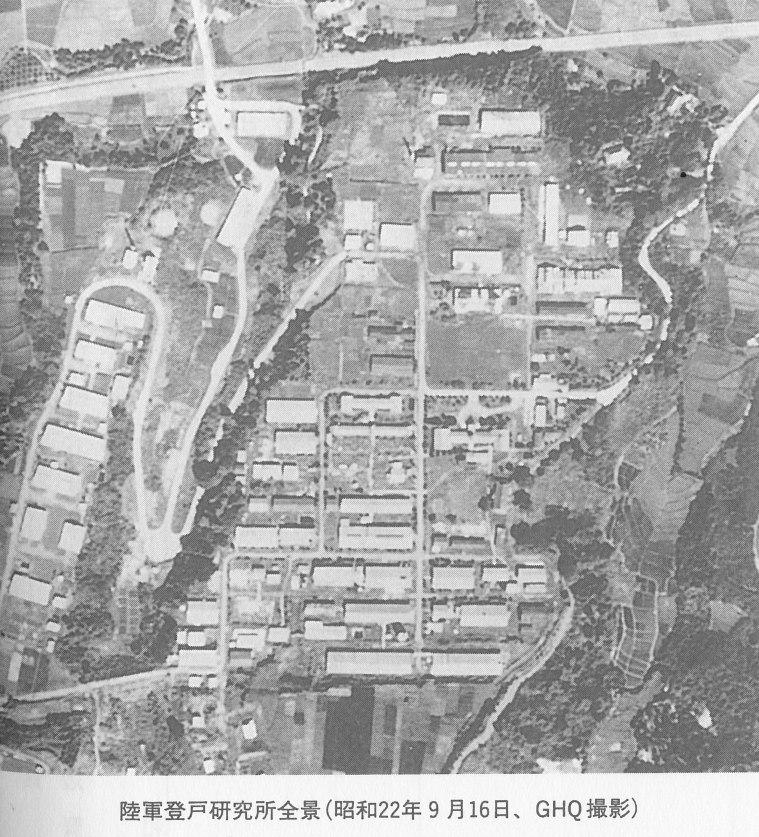
- Aerial view of the institute's compound, 1947
- Active: 1939–1945
- Country: Empire of Japan
- Branch: Imperial Japanese Army
- Type: Military research and development
- Garrison/HQ: Noborito, Tama-ku, Kawasaki, Kanagawa Prefecture, Japan
- Nickname: Noborito Research Institute

Commanders
- Notable commanders: Ryo Shinoda

The Noborito Research Institute (Japanese: 登戸研究所, Hepburn: Noborito Kenkyūjo), officially the Army Ninth Technical Research Institute (第9陸軍技術研究所, Dai-kyū Rikugun Gijutsu Kenkyūjo), was a military development laboratory run by the Imperial Japanese Army from 1939 to 1945. Based at a compound in the Noborito area of Tama-ku, Kawasaki, Kanagawa, the institute developed special weapons and equipment for covert operations. Noborito's projects included intelligence and spycraft items, counterfeit Chinese currency, chemical and biological weapons, and the Fu-Go balloon bomb.

== History ==
In 1919, the Imperial Japanese Army established the Army Science Research Institute (陸軍科学研究所, Rikugun Kagakukenkyūjo) in Tokyo to conduct basic research in military science and technology. In 1927, the institute added a section for covert warfare, led by Captain Ryo Shinoda. A new facility for the section was built in 1939 in the Noborito area of Tama-ku, Kawasaki, Kanagawa Prefecture, located across the Tama River from Tokyo. It was opened as the Noborito Research Institute (登戸研究所, Noborito Kenkyūjo), and in 1942 was named the Army Ninth Technical Research Institute (第9陸軍技術研究所, Dai-kyū Rikugun Gijutsu Kenkyūjo). By the start of the Pacific War, the compound had grown to 36 hectares (89 acres) and contained two dozen buildings, including several laboratories, a factory, and surrounding fields. Shinoda, a military engineer who studied chemistry at Tokyo Imperial University, oversaw its growth to a peak of almost 1,000 employees, with the largest budget of the 10 numbered research institutes. It was the only Army institute to develop items for covert warfare.

As the war deteriorated in early 1945, the institute's researchers left the compound for the mountains of Nagano Prefecture and other secure sites. Near the end of the war, the Army General Staff ordered all evidence of covert research at Noborito destroyed, and it was disbanded after Japan's surrender.

== Operations ==
Research and development at Noborito was conducted under utmost secrecy, and covered four main areas: intelligence, counterintelligence, covert action, and propaganda. The institute was divided into four research sections: Section 1, under Major General Sueki Kusaba, worked on balloon bombs, radio communications gear, death rays, and mines; Section 2, under Colonel Sakura Yamada, developed secret inks and papers, poisons, pathogens, miniature cameras, microdots, and other weapons; Section 3, under Colonel Kenzo Yamamoto, produced the materials for counterfeit foreign currencies and forged documents; and Section 4, under Colonel Masao Hatao, manufactured items developed in Sections 1 and 2. Shinoda, who by the end of the war achieved the rank of lieutenant general, and Major Shigeo Ban, who led a group in Section 2, later wrote that they looked to spy novels and movies for new ideas.

Between 1939 and 1941, the institute produced billions of yen worth of counterfeit Chinese currency to damage the Chinese economy as part of Operation Sugi. The Imperial Army used items produced by Noborito in a variety of operations, including special incendiary devices for raids on jungle camps in New Guinea and hydrogen cyanide for assassinations. Reliable and compact shortwave radio equipment developed at the institute kept operatives and soldiers on Iwo Jima and Okinawa in contact with the mainland for months after the islands were captured by the U.S. in 1945. Noborito also helped the Kempeitai (military police) in countering intelligence threats across the empire, developing equipment and techniques for examining fingerprints, footprints, tire tracks, and tooth marks; inspecting packages by X-ray; detecting secret resistance messages; and recording conversations in the open and over the telephone. The institute also developed bugging devices, explosives disguised as tins of food and coal, and false pens which dispensed bacteria for poisoning wells.

Some Noborito researchers worked with Army units involved in training and development in the fields of chemical and biological warfare. One of the more unique weapons developed at Noborito was the Fu-Go balloon bomb, about 9,300 of which were launched from Japan against the U.S. in 1944 and 1945. The project, initiated after the Doolittle Raid in 1942, was a technical success but a strategic failure, with about 300 reaching North America but failing to start the intended forest fires. One weapon that did not come to fruition was the microwave death ray, a project started in 1939; after the move to Nagano Prefecture in 1945, the institute's researchers built a never-used parabolic antenna 10 metres (33 ft) in diameter, intended to bring down U.S. bombers.

== After World War II ==
The U.S. Army secretly enlisted some members of the institute after the war. Shigeo Ban, for example, led a secret chemical unit at Yokosuka Naval Base during the Korean War. In 1950, the former institute's complex became the Ikuta campus of Meiji University. A museum, the Noborito Institute for Peace Education, opened on the campus in 2010. A documentary film which interviewed former employees, Army Noborito Laboratory, was released in 2013.
