= Kaijū (song) =

Single by Sakanaction
- Language: Japanese
- Released: February 20, 2025
- Genre: Rock
- Length: 4:12
- Label: NF
- Composer: Sakanaction
- Lyricist: Ichiro Yamaguchi
- Producer: Sakanaction

Sakanaction singles chronology
"Shock!" (2022)	"Kaijū" (2025)	"Iranai" (2026)

Music video
- "Kaijū" on YouTube

"Kaijū" (Japanese: 怪獣; lit. 'strange beast') is a song by Japanese rock band Sakanaction. It was released as a single through the band's NF Records, a Victor Entertainment subsidiary, on February 20, 2025, the band's first single release since "Shock!" in 2022. The song serves as the opening theme for the Japanese anime series Orb: On the Movements of the Earth. Commercially, Kaijū peaked at number two on both the Oricon Combined Singles Chart and Billboard Japan Hot 100.

== Background and release ==
On August 8, 2024, it was unveiled that Sakanaction would perform the opening theme of the anime adaptation for Orb: On the Movements of the Earth. The next month, on September 5, the official trailer for the anime was uploaded, announcing the opening theme's title, "Kaijū". At the first show of the band's tour Sakanaquarium 2025: Kaijū in Sagamihara on January 25, 2025, the band's vocalist, guitarist, and songwriter Ichiro Yamaguchi revealed that the song was just completed the day before the concert. The song was released on February 20, 2025; the band's first anime-affiliated work in their career and their first music in three years since "Shock!" in 2022.

== Lyrics and composition ==
According to Yamaguchi, "Kaijū" is focused on "how to make [the song] as abstract and persuasive as possible" rather than "easy-to-understand, concrete music," and mixed Sakanaction's musical style with the worldview of Orb: On the Movements of the Earth.

== Commercial performance ==
In Japan, "Kaijū" debuted at number two on the Oricon Combined Singles Chart for the date issued March 3, 2025, behind Sakurazaka46's "Udagawa Generation". It also topped the Digital Singles Chart, selling 28,497 units in its first week, surpassing Sakanaction's previous record, "Wasurerarenai no", with 22,034 units. "Kaijū" entered the Billboard Japan Hot 100 on February 26, 2025, at number two, reaching 26,512 downloads and 8,284,152 streams in its first week. The song also debuted atop the Download Songs, and number three on the Streaming Songs charts, before reaching the new peak at number two the next week with 9,942,536 streams, a 120% increase, the highest among that week's top-100 songs. Additionally, "Kaijū" debuted at number one on the specific-genre Hot Animation chart.

== Music video ==
A collaborative music video for "Kaijū" with Orb: On the Movements of the Earth was uploaded on February 20, 2025, the same day as the single release, which is available for a limited time of three months. Directed by Yusuke Tanaka, the music video features footage from the anime, from the first to 21st episode, the last episode to be aired before the video's release.

The official music video, also directed by Tanaka, premiered on March 15, following the anime's season finale. It depicts Yamaguchi carefully holding an unknown object, shaped like an egg, through a dimly lit underground metro station. Many of the people he runs into in the video try to steal the object from him, sometimes by force, or by manipulation, such as seduction and hypnosis. The video ends with Yamaguchi dropping the egg to an unidentified woman, before being pulled inside the station's wall.

== Live performances ==
Before the release, Sakanaction debuted the performance of "Kaijū" on the NHK television special Sakanaction Yamaguchi Ichiro "Chi" o Fukameru on October 28, 2024. The band performed the full-length version of the song for the first time at their concert tour Sakanaquarium 2025: Kaijū and later included it on the tour's setlist. Yamaguchi performed "Kaijū" live on his YouTube channel on February 20, shortly after the single's release.

== Accolades ==
Awards and nominations for "Kaijū"
Ceremony	Year	Award	Result	Ref.
Anime Grand Prix	2025	Best Theme Song	Won	
Japan Gold Disc Award	2026	Best 5 Songs by Streaming	Won	
Music Awards Japan	2026	Song of the Year	Won	
Music Awards Japan	2026	Best J-Rock Song	Won	
Music Awards Japan	2026	Best Anime Song	Won	
Music Awards Japan	2026	Best Music Video	Won	
Music Awards Japan	2026	Best Cover Artwork	Won	
Music Awards Japan	2026	Best of Listeners' Choice: Japanese Song	Nominated	
Reiwa Anisong Awards	2026	Best Work Award	Won	
Reiwa Anisong Awards	2026	Anikara Award	Nominated	

== Credits and personnel ==
- Sakanaction – composer, arrangement, string arrangement
  - Ichiro Yamaguchi – vocalist, lyrics
  - Motoharu Iwadera – electric guitar
  - Ami Kusakari – bass
  - Emi Okazaki – keyboards
  - Keiichi Ejima – drums
- Mikiko Ise – violin
- Mika Nakamura – violin
- Shoko Miki – viola
- Ayumi Hashimoto – cello
- Yuzuru Tomita – string arrangement
- Masashi Uramoto – recording, mixing
  - Minori Ishikawa – recording assistant, mixing assistant
  - Haruki Natsuyama – recording assistant
  - Seiya Fujita – recording assistant
  - Miyuki Nakamura – recording assistant
- Tsubasa Yamazaki – mastering
- Yuhi Kawamura – mastering assistant

== Charts ==
=== Weekly charts ===
Weekly chart performance for "Kaijū"
Chart (2025–2026)	Peak position
Global 200 (Billboard)	96
Japan (Oricon) with "Iranai"	5
Japan Combined Singles (Oricon)	2
Japan Anime Singles (Oricon) with "Iranai"	1
Japan Rock Singles (Oricon) with "Iranai"	1
Japan Hot 100 (Billboard)	2
Japan Hot Animation (Billboard Japan)	1

=== Monthly charts ===
Monthly chart performance for "Kaijū"
Chart (2026)	Peak position
Japan (Oricon) with "Iranai"	12
Japan Rock Singles (Oricon) with "Iranai"	1

=== Year-end charts ===
Year-end chart performance for "Kaijū"
Chart (2025)	Position
Japan Hot 100 (Billboard)	7
Japan Hot Animation (Billboard Japan)	4
Japan Streaming (Oricon)	10

== Certifications ==
Certifications for "Kaijū"
Region	Certification	Certified units/sales
Streaming
Japan (RIAJ)	3× Platinum	300,000,000^{†}
^{†} Streaming-only figures based on certification alone.
