= Aruku Around =

- Limited edition physical edition cover of "Aruku Around", featuring the song's lyrics.

Single by Sakanaction

from the album Kikuuiki
- Released: January 6, 2010
- Recorded: 2009
- Genre: Dance-rock, techno, electronica, folk
- Length: 4:26
- Label: Victor Entertainment
- Songwriter: Ichiro Yamaguchi
- Producer: Sakanaction

Sakanaction singles chronology
"Native Dancer" (2009)	"Aruku Around" (2010)	"Identity" (2010)

"Aruku Around" (Japanese: アルクアラウンド, Hepburn: Aruku Araundo; "Walk Around") (Japanese pronunciation: [aɾɯkɯ aɾaɯndo]), also known as "A Look Around", is a song by Japanese band Sakanaction. It was initially released as a digital download on January 6, 2010, before a wide release on January 13 as the band's second physical single.

The song was praised by critics for its synth-based dance sound, as well as lead vocalist Ichiro Yamaguchi's introspective and poetic lyrics. The song's music video won an excellence prize at the Japan Media Arts Festival, and Best Video of the Year award at the Space Shower Music Video Awards.

The song was a commercial success for the band, peaking in the top five of the Japanese Oricon record charts, and receiving a platinum certification from the Recording Industry Association of Japan.

== Background and development ==
After releasing two studio albums based in Sapporo, the band moved to Tokyo in Spring 2009 to further their musical potential. Their first album produced in Tokyo, Shin-shiro (2010), saw a new approach for the band, where Yamaguchi asked the other members of Sakanaction to produce songs individually, instead of together as a group. Led by the singles "Sen to Rei" and "Native Dancer", the album became their most commercially successful in their career to date, peaking at number eight on Oricon's album chart. Despite this, Yamaguchi was disappointed with the sales, and was not sure why the album stalled at 30,000 copies sold.

After the release of the album in January 2009, Sakanaction performed a two-month long tour of Japan, Sakanaquarium 2009: Shinshiro. This was followed by the band making appearances at many summer music festivals, including Sweet Love Shower, Nano-Mugen Fes, Rock in Japan and Rising Sun Rock Festival. On June 13, 2009, Sakanaction performed at Version 21.1, a newly created rock event set up by Sakanaction and the rock bands Ogre You Asshole and the Telephones to showcase rock music of the 2010s. On October 10, Sakanaction performed their first overseas concert, the Gentra X Ssamzie Sound Festival in Paju, South Korea.

== Writing and inspiration ==
Yamaguchi immediately started writing "Aruku Around" after the band finished their Sakanaquarium 2009: Shinshiro tour in March 2010. After being disappointed in Shin-shiro's sales total, Yamaguchi realized that the band needed to create a signature song that would be recognizable to a wide audience and would represent Sakanaction as a band. Yamaguchi felt that a song that would represent the band should be something non-fictional, so he wrote about his feelings after the end of the Shin-shiro tour, where he realized that Tokyo was now his home and not Hokkaido. Yamaguchi wanted to represent how he and the band members felt in that moment in the song's lyrics.

"Aruku Around" was written for the band to reach a wide audience with a commercial sound, and to rank well on the Japanese single charts. Despite this, Yamaguchi did not want the single to simply be a promotional took for their fourth album Kikuuiki, and wanted something that could stand by itself as its own work. To reach a wider audience, the band incorporated a stronger pop sound and strong 1980s dance music elements. After Yamaguchi wrote the song, the band's pianist Emi Okazaki created the basic arrangement. They continued to experiment with the song, performing it at the Rising Sun and Rock in Japan festivals over the summer to test the crowd's reaction, and changed the song based on how the audience reacted.

"Aruku Around" was released during the early recording stages for the band's album Kikuuiki. The song's success influenced the album strongly, making the band consider what music their new audience should hear, after knowing them only through "Aruku Around". This led to an album featuring compositions such as "Me ga Aku Aiiro" that illustrated completely different types of the music the band could create, instead of simply more of the same style of music as "Aruku Around".

== Promotion and release ==
The single was first announced in October 2009. After making its radio debut on November 30 on the Tokyo FM School of Lock! radio program, FM radio stations across Japan began airing the song in early December. At the same time, the song was used in television commercials for winter clothing brand Kissmark, which gained attention for the song. On December 2, the song was released as a downloadable ringtone. The full-length song was released to digital outlets Recochoku and iTunes on January 6, 2010 followed by a wide-release of the physical single on January 13. On January 17, the band performed a live concert broadcast on the Japan FM Network program Au Onair Music Chart, from Tokyo FM's Spain-zaka studio.

The full-length version of the single included two other tracks, the original B-side "Spoon to Ase" and a remix of the leading track from Shin-shiro, "Native Dancer", rearranged by electronic musician Rei Harakami. "Spoon to Ase" was written to be a song that was the complete opposite to "Aruku Around", and featured a strong acoustic guitar sound that mixed folk and electro genres in a similar way to Sakanaction's early music. Yamaguchi wanted to include a song like this to illustrate to listeners that Sakanaction released more than just dance music. As a part of the song's arrangement, it features the sound of drummer Keiichi Ejima and guitarist Motoharu Iwadera thumping their chests like gorillas.

Yamaguchi first encountered Harakami's album Lust (2005) while he worked at a record store, and immediately thought of Harakami when Sakanaction's team discussed including a remix on the single. The limited-edition version of the single features an additional track, ""Fish Alive Chapter 2" 1 Sequence by 3 Songs: Sakanaquarium 2009 @ Sapporo". This was a sequel to "Fish Alive" 30min., 1 Sequence by 6 Songs Sakanaquarium 2009 @ Sapporo (2009), a live extended play released on iTunes in the summer of 2009.

Since its release, the song has become a staple of the band's concert set-lists. Six recordings of performances of the song have been released. The first is found on the bonus DVD compiled on the band's "Identity" (2010) single taken from footage of their Sakanaquarium 2010 concert held at Shinkiba Studio Coast on May 15, 2010. This footage was re-released six months later when the full concert was released as the Sakanaquarium (C) video album. On the same day, footage from the band's performance at the Nippon Budokan on October 8, 2010, was released as Sakanaquarium (B). The song features on the band's following video albums, Sakanaquarium 2011 Documentaly: Live at Makuhari Messe, Sakanaquarium 2013 Sakanaction: Live at Makuhari Messe 2013.5.19, and Sakanatribe 2014: Live at Tokyo Dome City Hall, and makes an appearance on their digitally exclusive live album Sakanaquarium 2012 "Zepp Alive" (2012).

The song has appeared in the song lists of many Konami arcade games, such as Jubeat Knit (2010), Pop'n Music 19: Tune Street (2010) and Reflec Beat Limelight (2011). The song was also compiled as the final track on All Is Love Is All, a mix CD released by DJ Takehiko Hosaka to celebrate the 10th anniversary of the Soultoday rock event. In 2013, Gille covered the song in English for her album I Am Gille 2; the first time the band agreed for a musical act to cover one of their songs. The single's B-sides "Spoon to Ase" and "Native Dancer (Rei Harakami Heppoko Re-Arrange)" were compiled on the band's compilation album Natsukashii Tsuki wa Atarashii Tsuki: Coupling & Remix Works (2015).

== Cover artwork ==
The cover artwork for the single depicts the song's lyrics written on top of a woman's face, depicted in 1980s-style vivid coloring. The image is an altered picture of the band's bassist Ami Kusakari from the photoshoot for the band's album Shin-shiro, as she brushed hair out of her eyes. The covers were made by design team Hatos, who have worked with Sakanaction since their second album Night Fishing. Yamaguchi requested something relating to Japanese psychedelic literature, and to the 1980s, but never considered that Hatos would put the song's lyrics on the cover.

Because of copyright restrictions relating to the song's lyrics in Japan, the band could not use the actual cover artwork when promoting the single online or in magazines. Therefore, a dummy cover artwork was released for these mediums, replacing the lyrics with a notice apologizing for the lack of song lyrics. The limited edition four-tracked version of the single features the artwork in red, while the regular edition is colored in green. A third version of the cover was produced for the song's early digital release, dubbed the "Mikaeri Bijin Ver." (見返り美人Ver.; "Changed View Beautiful Person Ver."), featuring the artwork seen from a diagonal angle.

== Music video ==
The typographic objects used in the video for "Aruku Around" were praised by critics from the Japan Media Arts Festival. The shot above shows the objects from a misaligned angle, while the shot below shows vocalist Ichiro Yamaguchi walking past the objects as they become properly aligned in time to the song's lyrics.

The video was directed by Kazuaki Seki, while stylist Hisashi "Momo" Kitazawa acted as the video's producer, organizer, stylist and person in charge of Sakanaction members' visual appearance. It features footage of the terrace and a corridor of the Makuhari Messe convention center in Chiba, Chiba, shot on December 2, 2009. The video is a single five-minute shot taken late at night, where Yamaguchi walks past stands displaying pieces of Japanese typographic objects. As the camera moves to a specific spot, these pieces form the characters of "Aruku Around"'s lyrics as they are sung. Additional scenes feature the other band members of Sakanaction, who help display the characters in different ways, such as in a flip book, a computer monitor, a fish tank and conveyor belts. In the final scene, Yamaguchi walks out of the corridor and back onto the terrace, creating an infinite loop.

When Seki heard the song, he wanted to create a video that would express the song's lyrics well, noting that they were written entirely in Japanese. He discussed wanting to visually express the song's lyrics to the band in an interview, and suggested an idea he previously had learnt about: a camera technique where objects could only be seen from one particular angle. The band gave Seki full creative control over the project, however Yamaguchi requested that the video feature night and dark colors. To contrast with the song's digital sound, Seki decided to shoot the video without any digital editing, only utilizing analog techniques and objects. Seki felt that for the video to have its full effect, it should be shot in a single cut. He originally intended to shoot the video with a steadicam, however this equipment had difficulties being used for an uninterrupted five-minute take. Instead, Seki used a handheld Canon EOS 5D Mark II.

The video was created with the video sharing service YouTube in mind, after the band's previous music video "Native Dancer" (2009) received positive reception on the platform. The idea for the video's infinite loop was inspired by the replay function on YouTube.

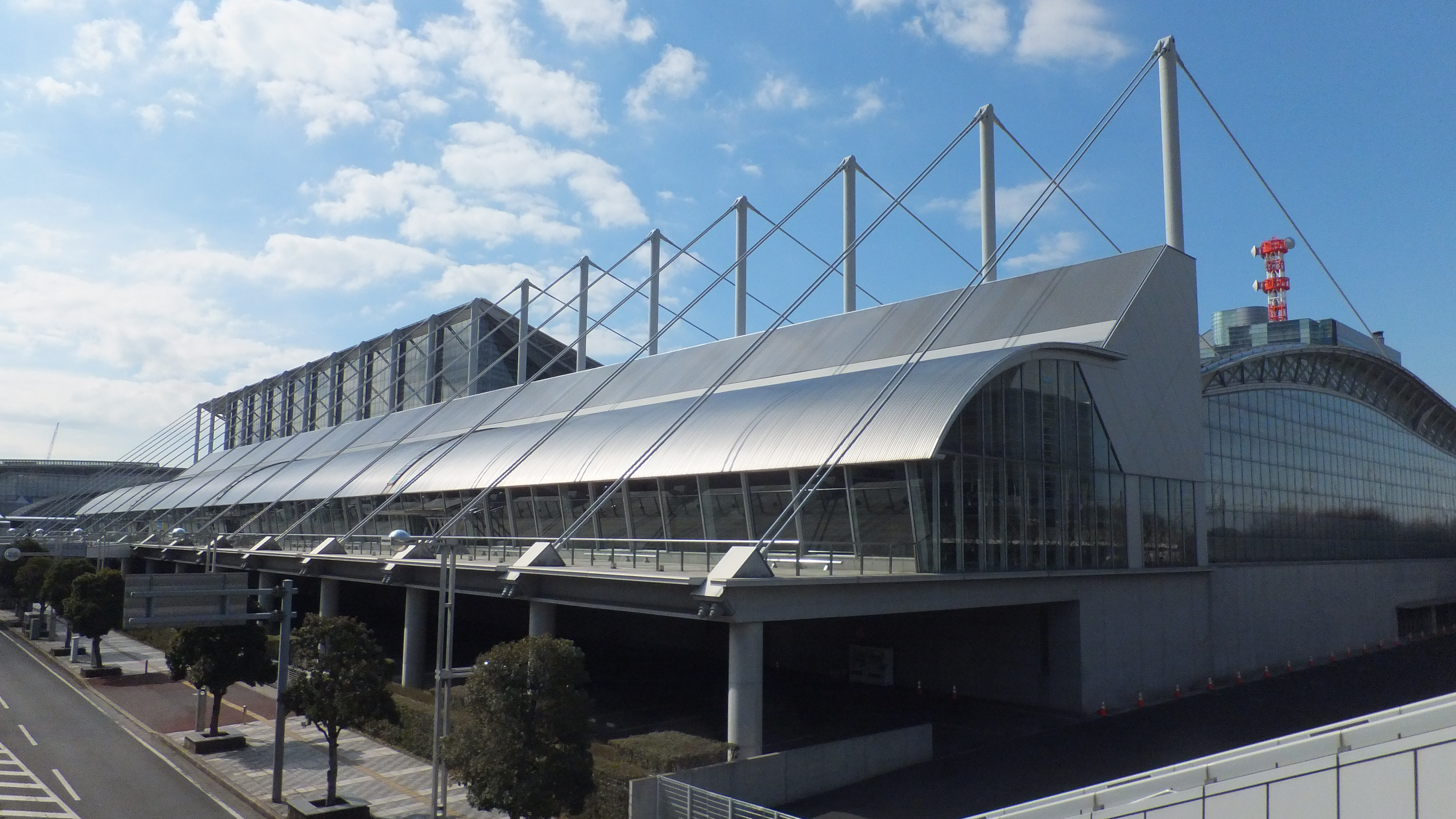
The music video was shot on the terrace and in a corridor of the Makuhari Messe convention center (pictured).

The music video staff were unable to enter Makuhari Messe before the day the video was going to be shot, so were unable to hold a trial run. The staff entered the building at 7:00am on the day, and started rehearsing with Sakanaction band members at 12:00am. From 3:00am onwards, they were able to record 10 takes of the video, however only two takes were successful. Okazaki had difficulty moving between the two locations she appeared in the scene in time, so she had to be transported by a staff member pushing her on a wheel chair. The band decided to release the earlier take of the video, as the second take was taken in the morning. This version was released on the band's Sakanarchive 2007-2011 video album in 2011. An additional video was created by the Tokyo FM radio program School of Lock!, featuring a selection of the 37 best cellphone videos out of 500 submissions by School of Lock! listeners across Japan.

On December 22, a sixty-second trailer was released for the video, featuring several cuts from the video, as well as scenes of the band performing the song not seen in the video. The video was uploaded to YouTube on December 24, 2009, and as of April 2015 has been viewed over 14,000,000 times.

At the 14th Japan Media Arts Festival, "Aruku Around" won an excellence prize in the festival's entertainment section. The judges praised the video as a "thrilling dead heat", praising the separated 3D typographic objects technique used in the video. They were impressed with the lack of CGI, and praised how the detailed typographic objects and rehearsing came together to create one "miracle moment". They described the video as being like a live session for visual media, and felt that the power balance between visual and audio was constantly changing throughout the video. At the Space Shower Music Video Awards, the video won both the Best Video of the Year and Best Rock Video awards. Kazuaki Seki, director of the song, received the Best Director award for 2010. An analysis of the music video was included in the 2014 edition of Bijitsu 2 (美術2), the Ministry of Education, Culture, Sports, Science and Technology certified textbook for teaching art in Japanese high schools to second year students. In October 2017, the song was awarded a "platinum award" by the Recording Industry Association of Japan.

== Reception ==
=== Critical reception ===
"Aruku Around"
Critics praised the synths, melody and beat of "Aruku Around".

The song received widespread acclaim from music critics in Japan. CDJournal reviewers gave the single its star of recommendation, calling it a "killer tune" where the "pleasure of living in the moment" and "prudence" is balanced. They noted the song's retro sound, like nostalgic dance music, and felt that the band's decision to move to Tokyo two years prior showed in the song. Yuji Tanaka of CDJournal praised the song's strong melody in particular. Kenji Sasaki of Skream! felt that the song had a "gentle electronica feel", praising the 1980s-style synths, aggressive band sound and "unique poetic sentiment" of Yamaguchi's. He further praised the emotions the song gave him, mixing both painfulness and exhilaration. Tomoki Takahashi of Rockin' On Japan felt the greatest strength of the song was how its lyrical content jarred with its "high-spirited words" and "explosive hybrid beat". He noted that instead of talking about the pleasures of the dance floor, Yamaguchi's lyrics were introspective, discussing loneliness, pain and longing. Takahashi praised the brave fanfare-like synth based leading melody, and the "tight" and "earth-shaking" four on the floor beat.

Critics also reviewed the single's two other tracks. CDJournal described "Spoon to Ase" as folk and electro blended together, and called the song's "wonderful sound fantasy-like", feeling that the quiet acoustic guitar backing "drifted in sorrow". They felt that even though Yamaguchi's "low energy" vocals gave "the impression of ennui", the lyrics "hid a quiet strength" that added to the song. Kenji Sasaki of Skream! found the song's acoustic sound and mysterious backing track blended together well to create a song with a "curious" feeling. For the Rei Harakami remix of "Native Dancer", CDJournal felt that this version had a "floating, light sound that makes you feel at ease", and that there was something nostalgic about the remix that matched the song's lyrics on transience well, while Sasaki described the remix as "beauty and strangeness twist and fight each other, while being wrapped up in Yamaguchi's lyrics."

=== Commercial reception ===
On Oricon's physical single charts, the song debuted at number three, selling 13,000 copies, making it the band's best chart performance since their debut in 2007. Rival sales tracking agency SoundScan Japan found that the vast majority of copies sold were of the single's limited four-track edition. The single spent an extra two weeks in the top forty singles, and in total eleven weeks in the top 200 releases. In this period, the single managed to sell an additional 14,000 copies, bringing the grand total to 27,000 sold.

The song first started receiving radio airplay in early December 2009. During the physical single's release week, radio airplay intensified, making the song the number four played song in Japan for that week. The combined sales and airplay success led the song to reach number four on the Billboard Japan Hot 100 The song performed well digitally as a sleeper hit. In its week of release, it debuted at number 38 on the RIAJ Digital Track Chart, however not reaching any higher. Two years after its initial release, it was certified as a gold single by the RIAJ for 100,000 paid downloads (excluding downloads on cellphones), and in October 2017 it was certified for 250,000 downloads across both PC and cellphone downloads.

== Track listings ==
digital download
No.	Title	Length
1.	"Aruku Around"	4:26
Total length:		4:26

All tracks are written by Ichiro Yamaguchi.

Physical single, digital EP
No.	Title	Arranger(s)	Length
1.	"Aruku Around"	Sakanaction, Yuzuru Tomita	4:26
2.	"Spoon to Ase" (スプーンと汗, "Spoon and Sweat")	Sakanaction	3:19
3.	"Native Dancer (Rei Harakami Heppoko Re-Arrange)" (ネイティブダンサー(rei harakami へっぽこ re-arrange), "Rei Harakami's Amateur Re-Arrangement")	Rei Harakami	6:13
Total length:			13:58

Limited edition bonus track
No.	Title	Arranger(s)	Length
4.	""Fish Alive Chapter 2" 1 Sequence by 3 Songs: Sakanaquarium 2009 @ Sapporo (Native Dancer, Sen to Rei, Adventure)" (ネイティブダンサー～セントレイ～アドベンチャー)	Sakanaction	14:12
Total length:			28:10

== Personnel ==
Personnel details were sourced from Kikuuiki's liner notes booklet. Music video personnel details were sourced from Sakanarchive 2007—2011: Sakanaction Music Video Collection.

Sakanaction

- All members – arrangement, production
- Keiichi Ejima – drums
- Motoharu Iwadera – guitar
- Ami Kusakari – bass guitar
- Emi Okazaki – keyboards
- Ichiro Yamaguchi – vocals, guitar, lyrics, composition

Personnel

- Satoshi Kamata – executive producer (Victor Records)
- Hiroyuki Makimoto – executive producer (Victor Records)
- Bin Tajima – executive producer (Hip Land Music Corporation)
- Yuzuru Tomita – cooperative keyboard arrangement
- Masashi Uramoto – mixing, recording

Music video personnel

- Kōzen Fujiwara – production design
- Nakaba Futagi – producer
- Kenji Ishida – hair, make-up
- Noriko Ishijima – production design
- Hisashi "Momo" Kitazawa – creative director, stylist
- Mikihiro Mano – production manager
- Kazuaki Seki – director
- Hiroyuki Yabe – camera
- Tsuyoshi Yamamoto – lighting

== Charts ==
Chart (2010)	Peak position
Japan Billboard Adult Contemporary Airplay	9
Japan Billboard Japan Hot 100	4
Japan Oricon daily singles	2
Japan Oricon weekly singles	3
Japan RIAJ Digital Track Chart	38

== Certification and sales ==
Region	Certification	Certified units/sales
Japan (Oricon) Physical	—	27,000
Japan (RIAJ) Digital	Platinum	250,000^{*}
Streaming
Japan (RIAJ)	Gold	50,000,000^{†}
^{*} Sales figures based on certification alone.^{†} Streaming-only figures based on certification alone.

== Release history ==
Region	Date	Format	Distributing Label	Catalog codes
Japan	November 30, 2009	radio debut	Victor Entertainment	
Japan	December 2, 2009	ringtone	Victor Entertainment	
Japan	January 6, 2010	digital download	Victor Entertainment	VEAML-23806
Japan	January 13, 2010	CD single, limited edition CD single	Victor Entertainment	VICL-36553, VICL-36554
South Korea	January 18, 2010	digital download	J-Box Entertainment	
Japan	January 30, 2010	rental CD single	Victor Entertainment	VICL-36553, VICL-36554
