= Noborito =

Neighborhood in Tama-ku, Kawasaki Prefecture, Japan

Coordinates: 35°37′15″N 139°34′12″E

Noborito (登戸) is a neighborhood in Tama-ku, Kawasaki, Kanagawa Prefecture, Japan just across the southwestern border of Tokyo on the Tama River and about 18 minutes south of Shinjuku on the Odakyu Odawara Line Express.

In 1927, Odakyu Line and Nanbu Line were constructed. Noborito Station became the interchange station.

During World War II, the Imperial Japanese Army established its secret institute, the Number Nine Research Laboratory, for researching special weapons, such as the Fu-Go balloon bomb, counterfeit bills, and other chemical and biological weapons. It is called the "Noborito Institute" now, and several houses are used by Meiji University.

For many years after 1945, Noborito was thought of as a rather sleepy suburb and company dormitory for workers to commute to more urban destinations such as Kawasaki, Tachikawa, and Shinjuku.

Noborito has the Okamoto Taro Art Museum and Minka-en folk village, both nearer Mukōgaoka-Yūen Station than Noborito Station.

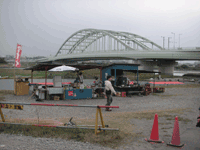
Tama River Noborito

Minka-en Suzuji house
