= Shin-shiro =

Album by Sakanaction

Studio album by Sakanaction
- Released: January 21, 2009
- Recorded: 2008
- Genre: New wave, rock, electronica, dance, techno, IDM
- Length: 50:40
- Language: Japanese
- Label: Victor Entertainment
- Producer: Sakanaction

Sakanaction chronology
Remixion (2008)	Shin-shiro (2009)	"Fish Alive" 30min., 1 Sequence by 6 Songs Sakanaquarium 2009 @ Sapporo (2009)

Singles from Shin-shiro
- 1. "Sen to Rei" Released: November 12, 2008; 2. "Native Dancer" Released: January 7, 2009

Shin-shiro (Japanese: シンシロ, Hepburn: Shinshiro, "New White") (Japanese pronunciation: [ɕiĩɕiɾo]) is the third studio album by Japanese band Sakanaction. It was released on January 21, 2009 through Victor Entertainment. The release was the band's first album after relocating to Tokyo and moving to Victor Entertainment's main roster. Led by the singles "Sen to Rei" and "Native Dancer", the album became the group's first release to chart in the top 10 albums on Oricon's weekly album chart.

Shin-shiro featured a different production approach to the band's previous albums. Band vocalist Ichiro Yamaguchi collaborated with a different member of the band in a two-person demo session for each songs, instead of their previous approach involving all five members working together. This approach was difficult for pianist Emi Okazaki, who had no experience with song production previously, and for drummer Keiichi Ejima, who learnt the guitar specifically to record demos for this album. The first finished demo, created by Yamaguchi and bassist Ami Kusakari's for the song "Sen to Rei" strongly influenced the album's production.

The album was well-received critically, with critics noting the band's growth; praising the band's electronic and pop sound, as well as Ichiro Yamaguchi's songwriting and vocals. The album led Sakanaction to be chosen one of the ten iTunes Japan Sound of 2009 artists, as well as nominated at the Life Music Award 2009.

In 2009, the album was made available globally as a digital download, alongside the band's debut and second albums Go to the Future (2007) and Night Fishing (2008). In 2015, the album was reissued on CD, LP record and lossless digital formats.

== Background and development ==
Sakanaction was first formed in 2005 in Sapporo, Hokkaido. The band gained notoriety in Hokkaido after winning the audition to perform as a newcomer artist at the Rising Sun Rock Festival in Otaru in August 2006, and after demos of their songs "Mikazuki Sunset" and "Shiranami Top Water" performed well on College Radio Japan Sapporo. The band were signed to major label Victor Entertainment, and released their debut album Go to the Future on May 7, 2007, through Victor's BabeStar Label, and followed this up eight month later with the album Night Fishing (2009).

The album is the band's first after joining the main Victor Entertainment roster, after releasing two albums with Victor sub-label BabeStar. After the release of Night Fishing, the band began looking for a new management company to sign a contract with. Originally, the members did not want to leave Sapporo, especially guitarist Motoharu Iwadera and bassist Ami Kusakari. Of the five management companies they were choosing between, none of them needed the band to relocate, except for Hipland Management. Vocalist Ichiro Yamaguchi realized that staying in Sapporo was against the band's goal of making music for a much wider group of listeners, and was surprised when all of the members agreed with him. In Spring 2008, the band moved to Tokyo from Hokkaido.

== Writing and production ==
=== Production techniques ===
In April, Sakanaction had already started making songs for Shin-shiro, despite having just finished their tour in March for the band's second album Night Fishing, which had been released in January of the same year. The album's production took a different approach to how Go to the Future and Night Fishing were produced. In their previous albums Yamaguchi produced the song demos, then took them to the studio and explained his vision for each song; creating them in sessions with all of the band members. For Shin-shiro, Yamaguchi created the songs, and then assigned each member of the band to create a demo based on their two-person vision. This was a conscious move by Yamaguchi to create a new sound for the album, figuring that if all of members were concurrently working on the songs, it was inevitable that one person would take charge of each song.

Iwadera worked with Yamaguchi on the songs "Ame (B)" and "Namida Delight", Kusakari on "Sen to Rei", pianist Emi Okazaki on "Light Dance", and drummer Keiichi Ejima on the instrumental composition "Minnanouta". Kusakari and Okazaki collaborated to create demos for "Kiiroi Kuruma". Yamaguchi worked by himself on the songs "Native Dancer" and "Enough", while all of the band members contributed to "Adventure" and "Human". The exception to this was "Zattō", which was an old composition from Sakanaction's early days in 2005, when Yamaguchi and Iwadera were the only members of the group. The song's arrangement was basically unchanged from the time of writing to its inclusion in the album. This pattern was not true for "Human", which was originally a song written before the album sessions, however was completely rewritten when included in Shin-shiro.

"Adventure" was created before the band left for Tokyo while they were experimenting with more approachable and pop sounds, and was intended to become the album's leading single, in the role that was later filled by "Sen to Rei". Similarly, in the early stages of the album's creation, Yamaguchi also considered Adventure as a title for the album. When the members were creating demos for songs, Yamaguchi had not at that point finished composing the songs for the album. After finishing each composition, he would give it to a member to develop; then return to composing more music while the members were all occupied. He found the two-person production process invigorating, and was quickly able to write the remaining album material.

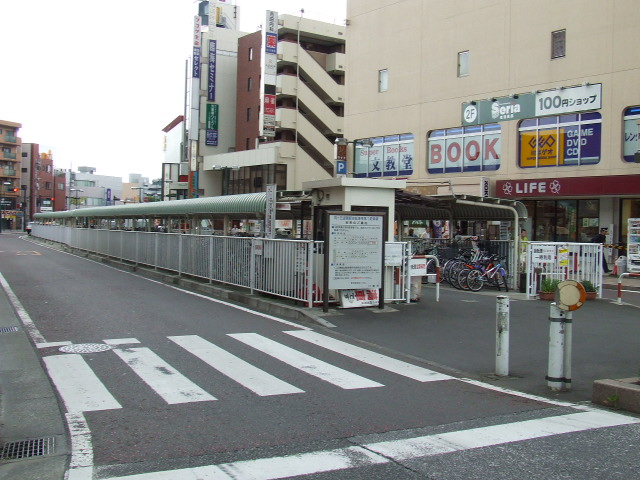
The album was the first to be recorded outside of Hokkaido, and was primarily created at Yamaguchi's apartment in the Noborito neighborhood (pictured) of Kawasaki, Kanagawa.

The band members all responded to this production method differently, with Iwadera and Kusakari finding the approach the easiest. Okazaki and Ejima both had trouble adopting this method. Okazaki was very anxious about her ability to create demos, having never used music software before, and not even owning a computer before moving to Tokyo. Yamaguchi bought her an iBook to help her with the process. Ejima found difficulty in recording demos due to the problem of recording drums at home for sound sampling. As a result, he learnt how to play the guitar. In June, the band were creating songs on a daily basis, and in August were still in the pre-production stages of the album. The album was created at Yamaguchi's apartment in Noborito in Kawasaki, Kanagawa, which became a meeting place for all of the band members for the album. In total, around thirty demo compositions were produced for the album. This method of song production also led to Yamaguchi being able to think of the album as a whole, as opposed to their methods on Go to the Future and Night Fishing, in which each song was thought of in its own individual context.

Kusakari was the fastest to finish her demo. Other than her, the other members brought their work half-finished to their meetings with Yamaguchi. The song Kusakari was working on, "Sen to Rei", became crucial to the creation of Shin-shiro, as the band created the entire album in response to the song. Taking note of the musical style of "Sen to Rei", the band created songs that showcased the other genres they performed, in order to expose new listeners to the entirety of the band's sound. This was for first-time listeners who came to know Sakanaction through "Sen to Rei" to be able to the entirety of the band's sound. Kusakari's version of the song "Sen to Rei" had a very strong guitar-based rock sound, which the band mixed with electronic music. "Sen to Rei" was a challenge for the band, to bring as many entertaining and popular aspects to their music as they could, to balance the underground attributes of their sound.

=== Demo production and location ===
Sakanaction found that after moving to Tokyo, where the band stood in the Japanese music scene was a lot clearer to them. The album's sound was inspired by Tokyo, and was a search to more consciously define what Sakanaction's identity was, compared to their first two albums. As a result, Shin-shiro felt like the end of the first chapter of Sakanaction to the band members. The music the band created on Shin-shiro was a mix of everything that the band wanted to try musically, and an attempt to make a more "colorful" album inspired by both new wave and live performance-style arrangements. They increased the tempo on the songs for the album, and focused on the beat of each song more than whether each song was structurally a pop song or not. Consciously attempting to create an album with a more popular sound, Yamaguchi was anxious about how his works would be received, and felt that these anxieties expressed themselves more on the album. For the song "Enough", however, Yamaguchi wanted to create one song on the album that expressed his own thoughts on the album without being influenced by these pressures. The final studio takes of the songs were recorded in September 2008.

The large amount of demos and separated work that each member was doing led to the creation of the instrumental song "Minnanouta" by Ejima. Originally Yamaguchi asked Ejima to create a song out of elements that Yamaguchi and Kusakari had discarded when making "Namida Delight", but Ejima eventually took his favorite parts from all of the discarded demo takes to create the piece. At first, the band did not intend to have an interlude on the album, however found it was a helpful guide for new listeners to Sakanaction's sound, and a good separator between the two halves of the album. "Namida Delight" also began as an instrumental song, however a melody and lyrics were added to the song after the band had entirely finished the piece.

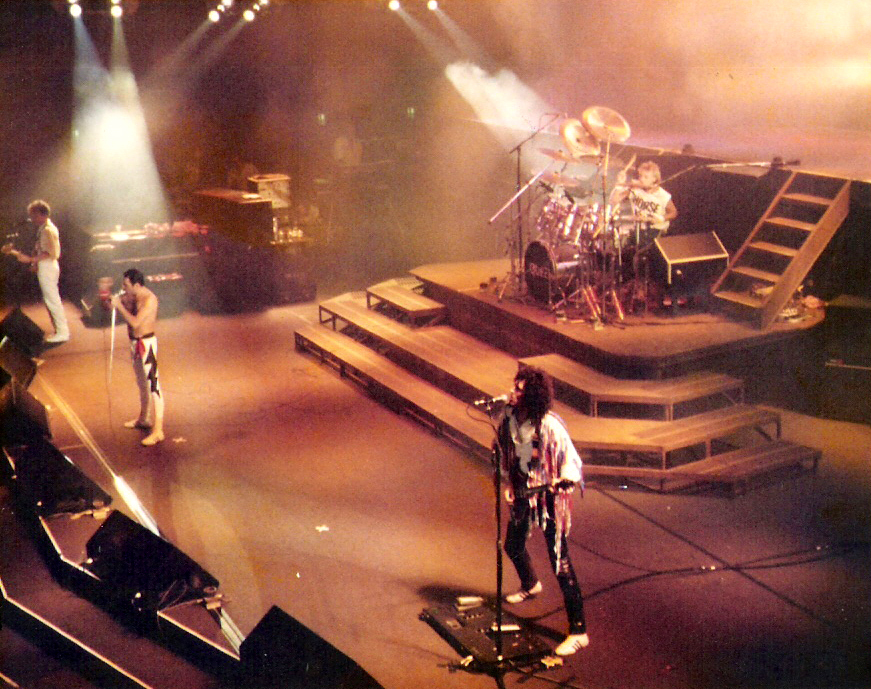
"Ame (B)" was inspired by the dance music of English band Queen (pictured in 1984).

The song "Ame (B)" was originally written as a folk song that Iwadera reworked into a progressive rock song. In the final stages of creation, Yamaguchi suggested they feature choral vocals in the song. Yamaguchi and Iwadera sung the vocal chorus themselves, with an additional three takes of Iwadera's voice layered on top of each other. It was inspired by British rock band Queen's 1980s dance music, and was written as what Yamaguchi thought was an "old style cool" song in a verse–chorus form, featuring two verses and a chorus. The version of the song featured on the album was built around the B verse alone, and felt similar to a remix to Yamaguchi because of this.

The demo version of the song "Light Dance" originally sounded similar to a war march, created this way by Okazaki was not very familiar with dance music. After fine-tuning the arrangement, and inserting "oriental" synths in the style of Japanese bands Yellow Magic Orchestra and Godiego, "Light Dance" settled at a new wave sound. Yamaguchi considered aspects of "Light Dance" and "Adventure" were similar to heavy metal, such as the bass drum being layered with different instruments, but felt that these would be interpreted as new wave by most people.

The final studio versions of the album songs were recorded at Galva Studio in Kyūden, Setagaya, Tokyo. Several compositions had additional recorded elements. For "Zattō", Iwadera and Yamaguchi incorporated a recording they had made of the crowds at Jiyūgaoka Station in Tokyo. Parts of "Ame (B)" were recorded outside, during a summer thunderstorm.

=== Title ===
The album's title Shin-shiro was intended to represent the kanji 新白, a neologism created by Yamaguchi meaning "new white", although it could also be interpreted as the homonym 真白 ("pure white"). Yamaguchi hoped to express how the album was compiled with new feelings, and express the theme of the album as newness. The word "shin-shiro" first appeared in Ichiro Yamaguchi's blog in February 2008, right after the release of Night Fishing. The cover design was created by the creative team Hatos, and features a waveform visual representation of the album title "Shin-shiro" being spoken.

== Promotion and release ==
The album was preceded by two singles. "Sen to Rei" was released on November 12, 2008, and later as the band's first physical CD single release on December 10. This was followed by a digital single "Native Dancer" in January 2009. "Native Dancer" served as the leading promotional track on Shin-shiro, promoted with a music video directed by Yuichi Kodama, featuring a pair of Nike sneakers performing an intricate dance. The video was critically successful, winning the best conceptual video award at the 2010 Space Shower Music Video Awards, and winning director Kodama the overall best director award.

The band performed a national tour of Japan in February and March 2009, entitled Sakanaquarium 2009: Shinshiro. The 13 date tour began in Kyoto on February 14, and ended with two performances in Sapporo on March 20 and 21. Following this, Sakanaction performed at three dates on Base Ball Bear's Live Mathematics Tour: April 29 in Kōriyama, Fukushima, April 30 in Mito, Ibaraki and on May 7 in Kōfu, Yamanashi. On October 10, Sakanaction performed their first overseas concert, the Gentra X Ssamzie Sound Festival in Paju, South Korea.

In 2015 the album was reissued, initially on vinyl record and a CD re-release in March, followed by a lossless digital release. Originally the band had planned on releasing a new studio album in March 2015, but they could not due to bassist Kusakari's pregnancy.

== Reception ==
=== Retrospective ===
In a retrospective interview on the album with Rockin' On Japan in 2011, Yamaguchi believed that many aspects of Sakanaction were not represented on the album, and felt that songs such as "Light Dance", "Zattō" and "Enough" only showed surface-level Sakanaction. The album's comparative commercial success created an odd feeling for the band, as even though it sold many more copies than their previous works, they were not sure why it had stopped selling at 30,000 copies. As a result of the album's disappointing sales, Yamaguchi felt that Sakanaction needed to create a signature song that would be recognisable to a wide audience and would represent Sakanaction as a band, and spent most of 2009 experimenting on the song "Aruku Around" (2010), released as the band's next single after Shin-shiro.

=== Critical reception ===
Critics positively reviewed Shin-shiro, with both CDJournal and Vibe reviewers noting the strong contrast to their first two studio albums. Mio Yamada of Vibe wrote that the album was completely different direction to their previous albums, feeling it was more accessible, while CDJournal felt that the album was more "colorful" and "radical". Yamada described it as a "Sakanaction-style road movie" about finding yourself, while being lonely, anxious and fed up with the tedium of everyday. Shirō Ise of Listen.jp noted the album's "high sense and edgy sound" based on "electronica and guitar rock", while being inspired by a variety of genres such as 1990s alternative rock, new wave, technopop, house, ambient music and African-American music. He praised the fact that despite how many genres the music was inspired by, the band's music did not forget the heart of songs. CDJournal praised the fact that each song stands on its own musically, instead of being drowned out by the album's overarching digital sound. Yuji Tanaka of CDJournal described the album as "dynamic technotronica rock" that fused the feel of live music with four on the floor beats. Alexey Eremenko of AllMusic gave the album four or of five stars, comparing it to the works of Asian Kung-Fu Generation. He felt that Sakanaction created "a fresh version of new wave", and felt that the album was "emotionally cohesive". He felt that none of the songs on Shin-shiro were "big catchy numbers", but felt that this was beneficial for the musical flow. Eremenko, however, criticized the album for being "too lightweight".

"Sen to Rei"
Critics noted the changing vocals of the chorus of "Sen to Rei", and praised the song's dynamic sound.

"Native Dancer"
The change from a piano-based song to an electronic dance song in "Native Dancer" was praised by CDJournal critics.

For the leading single "Sen to Rei", CDJournal reviewers praised Sakanaction's "ever-changing sound", and were impressed with the changing vocals in the song's chorus. They noted that the song was not very "showy", however felt that despite this, Sakanaction still expressed a "high quality hybrid" sound. Sakiko Okazaki of Rockin' On Japan praised the song's high-pitched synthesizers, fast-paced guitars, groovy bass and heart-hitting drums, and felt the song expressed the vigor of Sakanaction.

CDJournal praised Yamaguchi's "mostly detached but somehow cheerful vocals" in "Ame (B)", and felt that "Light Dance" was an "addictive, danceable number", and were impressed with the song's guitar solo, as well as how the digital sound brought up feelings of impatience and doubt. They noted the gap in "Native Dancer" between its dance rhythm and painful lyrical content, and were impressed with its transition from a "nostalgic" piano sound, developing into a dance song. For the instrumental track "Minnanouta", the reviewers praised the arrangement as "marvelous techno", and noted the song's distinctive sound loop, that "called out intoxication and ecstasy". Kuniko Yamada of Bounce felt the album was "fresh", and demonstrated the many senses that Sakanaction members had. She noted that the band were also comfortable in producing "guitar rock" songs such as "Sen to Rei", and that the four on the floor such as "Adventure" and "Ame (B)" would be comfortable on the dance floor. She singled out "Native Dancer" for its "beautiful fusion of acoustic and synth sounds", and felt that "Zattō" managed to be profound despite its simple arrangement.

In February, Sakanaction were named as one of the ten iTunes Japan Sound of 2009 artists: musicians who iTunes Japan staff expected to make it big in 2009. At Life Music Award 2009, a Tokyo FM competition based on radio DJ nominations, Sakanaction were the runners up for the Best Impact of Life award for most surprising act, however lost to 9mm Parabellum Bullet. In the 2009 CD Shop Awards, the album was chosen as one of the ten finalists.

=== Commercial reception ===
In its debut week, Shin-shiro was the eighth most sold album in Japan according to the Japanese music chart Oricon, selling 12,000 copies. This resulted in the band having their first top fifty release, and outselling their first two albums in a single week. Rival sales tracking agency SoundScan Japan tracked 10,000 physical copies sold in the single's first week, and a total of 16,000 copies over two weeks. The album continued to chart in the top 100 albums for four more weeks, and the top 300 for an additional three, selling an additional 16,000 units. During the release of the band's single "Aruku Around" in January 2010, the album re-charted for a seven weeks, selling an additional 4,000 copies. After re-entering the chart for a single week in 2012 and being reissued in 2015, the album's current sales total adds to 34,000 copies. In tracking regional sales, CDJournal noted the album had broad charting success across all of Japan, and was the band's first album to perform well in the regional centers of Nagoya, Osaka and Fukuoka.

== Track listing ==
All lyrics are written by Ichiro Yamaguchi

No.	Title	Music	Length
1.	"Ame (B)" ("Rain (B)")	Yamaguchi	3:36
2.	"Light Dance" (ライトダンス Raito Dansu)	Yamaguchi	3:32
3.	"Sen to Rei" (セントレイ, "1000 & 0")	Yamaguchi	3:59
4.	"Native Dancer" (ネイティブダンサー Neitibu Dansā)	Yamaguchi	4:24
5.	"Minnanouta" ("Everyone's Song")	Sakanaction	6:15
6.	"Zattō" (雑踏, "Bustle")	Yamaguchi	5:23
7.	"Kiiroi Kuruma" (黄色い車, "Yellow Car")	Yamaguchi	3:56
8.	"Enough"	Yamaguchi	5:47
9.	"Namida Delight" (涙ディライト Namida Diraito, "Tear Delight")	Yamaguchi	4:02
10.	"Adventure" (アドベンチャー Adobenchā)	Yamaguchi	4:54
11.	"Human"	Yamaguchi	4:52
Total length:			50:40

== Personnel ==
Personnel details were sourced from Shin-shiro's liner notes booklet.

Sakanaction

- All members – arrangement, production, composition (#5)
- Keiichi Ejima – drums
- Motoharu Iwadera – guitar
- Ami Kusakari – bass guitar
- Emi Okazaki – keyboards
- Ichiro Yamaguchi – vocals, guitar, lyrics, composition (#1-4, #6-11)

Personnel and imagery

- Toshihiko Fujimi – executive producer
- Hatos – artwork
- Kenji Ishida – hair, make-up
- Kentaro Ishikawa – A&R
- Daisuke Ishizaka – photography
- Ted Jensen – mastering (reissued edition)
- Satoshi Kamata – executive producer
- Kamikene – art direction, design
- Yuka Koizumi – mastering
- Yujiro Mitsugi – manager
- Tatsuya Nomura – executive producer (Hip Land Music Corporation)
- Normalization – artwork
- Yuzuru Tomita – cooperative keyboard arrangement (#1, #2, #4, #10)
- Masashi Uramoto – mixing, recording
- Wataru Woka – A&R

== Charts ==
Chart (2009)	Peak position
Japan Billboard Top Albums Sales	11
Japan Oricon daily albums	5
Japan Oricon weekly albums	8
Chart (2015)	Peak position
Japan Oricon weekly albums	64

=== Sales ===
Chart	Amount
Oricon physical sales	34,000

== Release history ==
Region	Date	Format	Distributing Label	Catalogue codes
Japan	January 21, 2009	CD (limited edition), digital download	Victor Entertainment	VICL-63223
Japan	March 24, 2009	CD (regular edition)	Victor Entertainment	VICL-63224
Taiwan	April 10, 2009	CD	Rock Records	GUT2262
South Korea	April 13, 2009	digital download	J-Box Entertainment	—
Worldwide	July 15, 2009	digital download	Victor Entertainment	—
South Korea	October 8, 2009	CD	Mnet Media	2383479
Japan	March 18, 2015	lossless digital download	Victor Entertainment	VEAHD-10614
Japan	March 25, 2015	CD, LP record	Victor Entertainment	VICL-64345, VIJL-60148～9
