= Sakanaction =

Japanese rock band

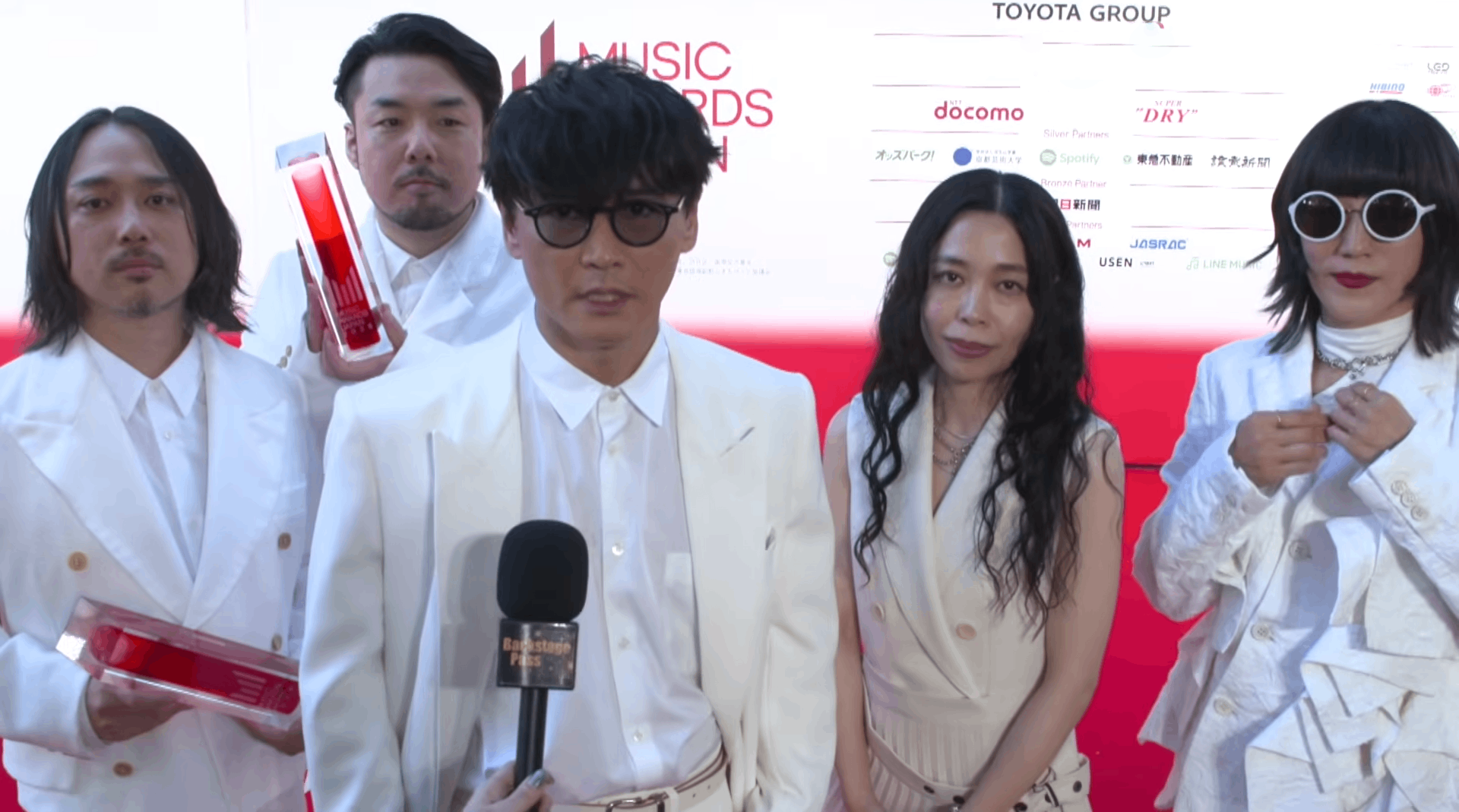
- Sakanaction at the 2026 Music Awards Japan; From left to right: Motoharu Iwadera, Keiichi Ejima, Ichiro Yamaguchi, Ami Kusakari, and Emi Okazaki

Background information
- Origin: Sapporo, Japan
- Genres: Alternative rock; indie rock; new wave; electronica; big beat
- Years active: 2005–present
- Labels: BabeStar (2007-2008); Victor (2009-present); NF (2015-present)
- Members: Ichiro Yamaguchi; Motoharu Iwadera; Ami Kusakari; Emi Okazaki; Keiichi Ejima
- Website: sakanaction.jp (in Japanese)

Sakanaction (Japanese: サカナクション, Hepburn: Sakanakushon; stylised in all lowercase) are a Japanese rock band from Sapporo, Hokkaido. Their music is a fusion of alternative rock, electronic, pop, and new wave styles. The band consists of five members: Ichiro Yamaguchi, Motoharu Iwadera, Ami Kusakari, Emi Okazaki, and Keiichi Ejima.

The name Sakanaction is a portmanteau of sakana (Japanese for "fish") and "action". In the band's own words, their name reflects a wish to act quickly and lightly, like fish in the water, without fearing changes in the music scene. Their records consistently reach the top 10 positions on Japan's Oricon charts.

== History ==
=== Formation ===
Ichirō Yamaguchi, Sakanaction's frontman, originally started a band called Dutchman, in 1998 with his fellow high school mates, including Motoharu Iwadera. It was an indie rock band that was heavily inspired by British indie bands. From 2000 to 2003, they released one maxi single titled Fly, one album titled demonstration, and a single titled "Mikazuki Sunset" that was only sold at live performances. The band did not gain much recognition. In 2004, the members disbanded, leaving Yamaguchi to continue on alone as Dutchman. Yamaguchi began performing as a DJ at night clubs.

Sakanaction was finally created in 2005. When Yamaguchi was working in a record store, he heard the song "Owari no Kisetsu" by Rei Harakami and it became a great motivation for him to create Sakanaction. Yamaguchi founded the band together with Iwadera. In the spring of 2006, the rest of the members joined. Kusakari had just left another band then and was asked to join Sakanaction, Ejima was introduced by a mutual friend, and Okazaki was Yamaguchi's colleague from the record store.

The name "Sakanaction" was created by Yamaguchi and was met with initial resistance from Iwadera. When Yamaguchi asked him what he thought of the name Sakanaction, Iwadera said he hated it but Yamaguchi forced it.

=== Rise to popularity ===
Sakanaction first attracted attention at the 2006 Rising Sun Rock Festival. The band's first physical release was Go to the Future in 2007. Three songs originally from Dutchman were rereleased as Sakanaction releases - Mikazuki Sunset and Inner World were included in Go to the Future while Word was part of a digital download release, and later made it to Night Fishing.

Some time after the release of Night Fishing, the band made a decision to move from Hokkaido to Tokyo where they could reach out to more people. They were also moved from Victor Entertainment's BabeStar label to the main label.

On August 9, 2008, Sakanaction performed as one of the main acts on one of Japan's top music stations, Music On! in the event called Summer Sonic '08. Sakanaction performed alongside Paul Weller, The Fratellis, Death Cab for Cutie, Cajun Dance Party, Band of Horses, Blood Red Shoes, and These New Puritans. The show aired just three days before the New Year, on December 29, 2008.

On December 26, 2008, they made it to #9 on Billboard's Japan Hot 100 list with their single "Sen to Rei" beating out MAYS's "Kiss (Koi ni Ochite... Fuyu)" and coming in just after Greeeen's "Tobira". Over a course of 4 weeks the single moved from #91 to #9. This was a big accomplishment for Sakanaction as they moved forward in the Japanese music industry.

=== Mainstream success ===
In December 2008, the band announced their third album, Shin-shiro, which was released in January, 2009. The album includes their debut single, "Sen to Rei", The album debuted at #8 on Oricon weekly charts, the first time they got into the Top 10. The band held a national promotional tour, Sakanaquarium 2009, in February and March 2009.

On January 13, 2010, the band released the single "Aruku Around", which hit #3 on the Oricon weekly charts. On August 8, 2010, they made appearances at both the Summer Sonic and the World Happiness 2010 rock festivals in Tokyo.

Sakanaction next released on March 16, 2011, a new single titled "Rookie". Almost seven months since their last single "Identity", "Rookie" centered on club music, pop, and rock. It peaked at #6 on the Oricon weekly charts, although sales were affected by the 2011 Tōhoku earthquake and tsunami.

On March 22, the music video for "Aruku Around" picked up awards for Best Rock Video and Best Video of the Year from the 2011 Space Shower Music Video Awards, earning the band more recognition.

On July 20, 2011, Sakanaction released their second single of the year, "Bach no Senritsu o Yoru ni Kiita Sei Desu.". This release helped them to gain even more popularity through Sakanaction's first ever live performance on the popular music variety show, Music Station.

Their fifth album, Documentaly, was released on September 28, 2011, reaching a peak of #2 on the Oricon weekly charts, the highest the band has ever charted. The band also embarked on the Sakanaquarium 2011 DocumentaLy tour beginning October 1. The Makuhari Messe leg of the tour was later documented on a live DVD and Blu-ray released on March 28, 2012.

In February, the band played live overseas for the second time, in Taiwan, together with rock bands Avengers in Sci-Fi and Lite under the same artist management Hip Land Music Corp. On March 20, 2012, Sakanaction took home awards for Best Rock Video and Best Video of the Year at the 2012 Space Shower Music Video Awards for "Bach no Senritsu o Yoru ni Kiita Sei Desu." This was the band's second consecutive year winning the coveted Best Video of the Year award. Starting April, the band also started to host their own regular radio show, Sakana Locks!! on popular radio station Tokyo FM.

=== Continued national success ===
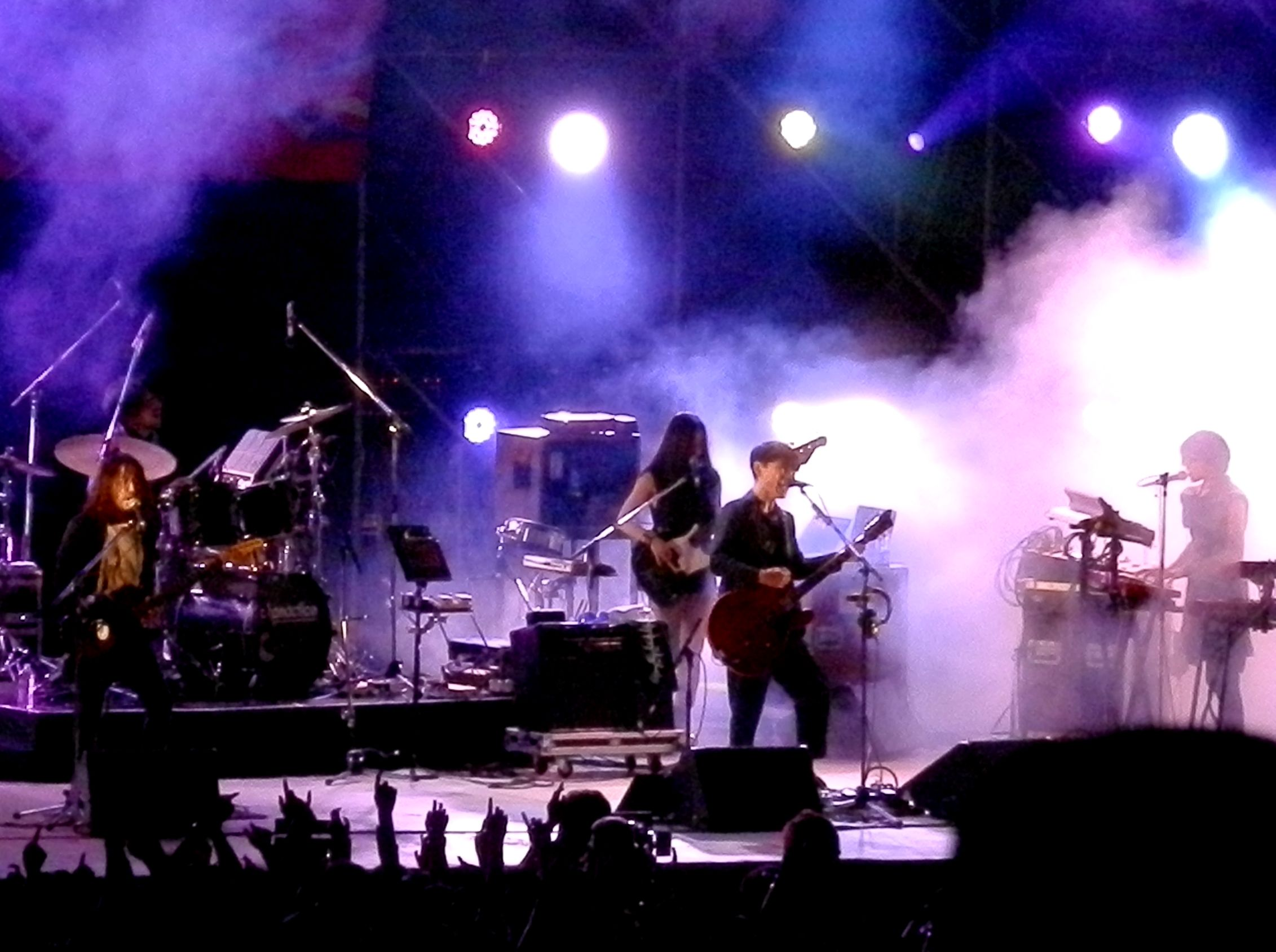
Sakanaction at the Join Alive rock festival in Hokkaido, 2013

Their sixth single, "Boku to Hana", was released on May 30. The title track was used as the theme song of primetime medical drama 37-sai de Isha ni Natta Boku: Kenshui Junjō Monogatari, the first time the band has collaborated with a drama, thus giving them more exposure. Sakanaction continued to garner more attention as vocalist Yamaguchi composed and wrote the song "Moment" for the popular veteran boy band SMAP, who were label mates. The song was used as the theme for 2012 Summer Olympics broadcasts on television channel TBS, and was released in a single on 8 August 2012.

On 29 August 2012, their seventh single "Yoru no Odoriko" was released. The song was used in Mode School commercials as well as a station ID for Space Shower Television. In addition, Sakanaction was allowed to perform again for the second time on Music Station. Their eighth single "Music" was tied up with Fuji TV primetime drama, dinner, with the title track as its theme song, making it the second time the band's music was used for a drama. The single was released on 23 January 2013, for the first time selling at 500 yen, compared to their usual singles being priced at 1000 yen and above.

Again, for the third year running, Sakanaction managed to grab an award at the 2013 Space Shower Music Video Awards. They were awarded Best Artist, with their representative works being the music videos for "Boku to Hana" and "Yoru no Odoriko".

The band released on 13 March 2013 their self-titled sixth album, which clinched the top spot on Oricon Weekly Charts, their first release to do so. For the album, Sakanaction went on a sold-out nationwide tour starting 30 March. They also included a supplementary tour in Taiwan to play there for 2 days. The band released their first vinyl record, titled Inori EP on 26 June 2013, containing remixes of two songs from the album.

With their sixth album and accompanying tour's success in 2013, they were invited to perform for the first time on NHK's prestigious music show Kōhaku Uta Gassen on 31 December.

Sakanaction went on tour in early 2014. They have also announced the release of a new single, "Goodbye" / "Eureka", for 15 January 2014. "Eureka" is tied-up with the film "Judge!" as its ending theme song.

Singles from their album entitled 834.194 have also found success on YouTube. For example, the single "Shin Takarajima" has 147,000,000 views, and "Wasurerarenai no", released on June 21, 2019, has enjoyed over 23 million views. In videos, many of the albums' serious topics are offset by vivid and playful situations such as cheerleading, retro celebrity appearances, and people who transform into other objects.

In late 2021, they announced their eighth and ninth studio albums, アダプト (Adapt), and アプライ (Apply). Adapt was released on March 30, 2022. It was preceded by two singles, プラトー (Plateau), and ショック! (Shock!).

On December 22, 2025 it was announced that Sakanaction would be in charge of theme song of Nippon Television's January 7, 2026, drama "Kochira yobi jieieiyūho?!". The song, "Iranai", was written by Sakanaction's Yamaguchi and the drama's director Koji Kato.

The band joined the 2025 Kohaku Uta Gassen. They played the song Kaijū firstly and Shin Takarajima secondly. It was the first on-stage show after Yamaguchi had been diagnosed for depression.

Sakanaction won the award for Best Rock Band/Solo Artist at the 2026 edition of Music Awards Japan. Additionally, Kaijū was nominated for and won a number of awards including Song of the Year held on June 13, 2026.

== Members ==
Except for Kusakari, all members are born in Hokkaido.

- Ichirō Yamaguchi (山口一郎, Yamaguchi Ichirō)
  - Born in Otaru, Hokkaidō, September 8, 1980
  - Male
  - Vocalist and guitarist
  - Responsible for writing the band's lyrics and music
- Motoharu Iwadera (岩寺基晴, Iwadera Motoharu)
  - Born in Sapporo, Hokkaidō, March 11, 1981
  - Male
  - Guitarist
- Ami Kusakari (草刈愛美, Kusakari Ami)
  - Born in Tokyo, April 30, 1980
  - Female
  - bass player
- Emi Okazaki (岡崎英美, Okazaki Emi)
  - Born in Otaru, Hokkaidō, October 5, 1983
  - Female
  - Keyboardist
- Keiichi Ejima (江島啓一, Ejima Keiichi)
  - Born in Sapporo, Hokkaidō, July 8, 1981
  - Male
  - Drummer

== Discography ==
Studio albums

- Go to the Future (2007)
- Night Fishing (2008)
- Shin-shiro (2009)
- kikUUiki (2010)
- DocumentaLy (2011)
- Sakanaction (2013)
- 834.194 (2019)
- Adapt (2022)

== Tours ==
Go to the Future Release Tour

2007.05.11 Tokyo・Shimokitazawa Era
2007.05.12 Osaka・Live Square 2nd LINE
2007.05.13 Aichi・Club JB'S

Go to the Future Release One-Man Live

2007.05.27 Hokkaido・Bessie Hall

Sakanaction Live in Okinawa 2007

2007.10.19 Okinawa・Naha Central

Tour 2008 "Night Fishing is Good"

2008.03.01 Nagasaki・stugio DO
2008.03.02 Fukuoka・Beat Station
2008.03.04 Hiroshima・Namiki Junction
2008.03.08 Hokkaido・Penny Lane 24
2008.03.20 Miyagi・Club Junk Box
2008.03.23 Tokyo・Shibuya Club Quattro
2008.03.27 Aichi・Apollo Theater
2008.03.29 Osaka・Shinsaibashi Club Quattro

Sen Live

2008.12.20 Hokkaido・Cube Garden

Rei Live

2008.12.20 Hokkaido・Cube Garden

Sakanaquarium 2009 Shinshiro

2009.02.14 Kyoto・Kyoto Muse
2009.02.15 Aichi・Nagoya Club Quattro
2009.02.27 Fukuoka・Beat Station
2009.03.01 Osaka・Bigcat
2009.03.03 Okayama・Image
2009.03.04 Hiroshima・Namiki Junction
2009.03.07 Tokyo・Akasaka Blitz
2009.03.11 Nagano・Live House J
2009.03.12 Ishikawa・Vanvan V4
2009.03.14 Niigata・Club Riverst
2009.03.15 Miyagi・Macana
2009.03.20 Hokkaido・Penny Lane 24
2009.03.21 Hokkaido・Penny Lane 24

Sakanaquarium 2009 kikUUiki

2010.04.02 Osaka・Namba Hatch
2010.04.09 Aichi・Club Diamond Hall
2010.04.11 Niigata・Club Junk Box Niigata
2010.04.16 Miyagi・Darwin
2010.04.17 Fukushima・HipShot Japan
2010.04.24 Kagoshima・Caparvo Hall
2010.04.25 Fukuoka・Drum Logos
2010.04.28 Hiroshima・Namiki Junction
2010.04.29 Okayama・Image
2010.05.01 Kyoto・Kyoto Muse
2010.05.02 Ishikawa・Kanazawa AZ
2010.05.08 Hokkaido・Zepp Sapporo
2010.05.15 Tokyo・Shinkiba Studio Coast
2010.05.23 Osaka・Zepp Osaka
2010.05.28 Tokyo・Zepp Tokyo

Sakanaquarium 21.1(B)

2010.10.08 Tokyo・Nippon Budokan

Sakanaquarium 2011 "Zepp Alive"

2011.06.18 Hokkaido・Zepp Sapporo
2011.06.20 Aichi・Zepp Nagoya
2011.06.22 Osaka・Zepp Osaka
2011.06.23 Osaka・Zepp Osaka
2011.06.27 Tokyo・Zepp Tokyo
2011.06.28 Tokyo・Zepp Tokyo

Sakanaquarium 2011 DocumentaLy

2011.10.01 Niigata・Niigata Lots
2011.10.02 Ishikawa・Kanazawa Eighthall
2011.10.07 Miyagi・Zepp Sendai
2011.10.09 Hokkaido・Zepp Sapporo
2011.10.12 Hiroshima・Club Quattro
2011.10.14 Fukuoka・Zepp Fukuoka
2011.10.15 Kumamoto ・Drum Be-9 V1
2011.10.17 Aichi・Zepp Nagoya
2011.10.19 Osaka・Namba Hatch
2011.10.20 Osaka・Namba Hatch
2011.10.22 Okayama・Crazymama Kingdom
2011.10.23 Kochi・Caravan Sary
2011.11.06 Chiba・Makuhari Messe
2011.11.10 Kyoto・KBS Hall
2011.11.11 Kyoto・KBS Hall

Sakanaquarium 2012 "Citta'Alive"

2012.05.29 Kanagawa・Club Citta'

Sakanaquarium 2012 "Zepp Alive"

2012.05.31 Hokkaido・Zepp Sapporo
2012.06.05 Osaka・Zepp Osaka
2012.06.06 Osaka・Zepp Osaka
2012.06.08 Miyagi・Zepp Sendai
2012.06.12 Aichi・Zepp Nagoya
2012.06.13 Aichi・Zepp Nagoya
2012.06.15 Fukuoka・Zepp Fukuoka
2012.06.18 Tokyo・Zepp Tokyo
2012.06.19 Tokyo・Zepp Tokyo

Sakanaquarium 2013 sakanaction

2013.03.30 Miyagi・Tokyo Electron Hall
2013.04.06 Hokkaido・Zepp Sapporo
2013.04.07 Hokkaido・Zepp Sapporo
2013.04.10 Kyoto・Kyoto KBS Hall
2013.04.11 Kyoto・Kyoto KBS Hall
2013.04.13 Niigata・Niigata Lots
2013.04.14 Niigata・Niigata Lots
2013.04.20 Kouchi・Kouchi Bay5 Square
2013.04.21 Hiroshima・Hiroshima Blue Live
2013.04.24 Aichi・Zepp Nagoya
2013.04.25 Aichi・Zepp Nagoya
2013.04.27 Fukuoka・Zepp Fukuoka
2013.04.28 Fukuoka・Zepp Fukuoka
2013.05.18 Chiba・Makuhari Messe
2013.05.19 Chiba・Makuhari Messe
2013.05.22 Osaka・Osaka-jo Hall
2013.06.01 Okinawa・Okinawa Otoichiba

Sakanaquarium 2013 sakanaction in Taiwan

2013.06.14 Taiwan・The Wall Taipei
2013.06.15 Taiwan・The Wall Taipei

Sakanaquarium 2014 "Sakanatribe"

2014.01.23 Tokyo・Zepp Tokyo
2014.01.24 Tokyo・Zepp Tokyo
2014.01.29 Osaka・Zepp Osaka
2014.01.30 Osaka・Zepp Osaka
2014.02.01 Hiroshima・Ueno Gakuen Hall
2014.02.02 Kagawa・Sunport Hall Takamatsu
2014.02.07 Miyagi・Tokyo Electron Hall Miyagi
2014.02.08 Miyagi・Tokyo Electron Hall Miyagi
2014.02.11 Ishikawa・Kanazawa Bunka Hall
2014.02.15 Hokkaido・Zepp Sapporo
2014.02.16 Hokkaido・Zepp Sapporo
2014.02.25 Aichi・Zepp Nagoya
2014.02.26 Aichi・Zepp Nagoya
2014.03.01 Niigata・Niigata Terrsa
2014.03.07 Fukuoka・Zepp Fukuoka
2014.03.08 Fukuoka・Zepp Fukuoka
2014.03.11 Tokyo・Zepp Tokyo
2014.03.12 Tokyo・Zepp Tokyo

== Awards and nominations ==
List of awards and nominations
Award	Year	Category	Recipient	Result	Ref.
Anime Grand Prix	2024	Best Theme Song	"Kaijū"	1st	
CD Shop Awards	2010	Grand Prix Finalist Award	Shin-shiro	Won	
CD Shop Awards	2011	Grand Prix Finalist Award	Kikuuiki	Won	
CD Shop Awards	2012	Grand Prix Finalist Award	Documentaly	Won	
CD Shop Awards	2014	Grand Prix Finalist Award	Sakanaction	Won	
CD Shop Awards	2019	Live Video Award	Sakanaquarium 2017: 11th Anniversary Arena Session 6.1ch Sound Around	Won	
CD Shop Awards	2020	Grand Prix Finalist Award	834.194	Won	
Japan Gold Disc Award	2026	Best 5 Songs by Streaming	"Kaijū"	Placed	
Japan Academy Film Prize	2016	Outstanding Achievement in Music	Bakuman	Won	
Japan Media Arts Festival	2010	Excellence Prize — Entertainment Division	"Aruku Around"	Won	
Japan Record Awards	2013	Excellence Album Award	Sakanaction	Won	
MTV Video Music Awards Japan	2012	Best Rock Video	"Bach no Senritsu o Yoru ni Kiita Sei Desu"	Nominated	
MTV Video Music Awards Japan	2013	Best Rock Video	"Yoru no Odoriko"	Nominated	
MTV Video Music Awards Japan	2014	Best Rock Video	"Good-Bye"	Nominated	
MTV Video Music Awards Japan	2015	Best Group Video — Japan	"Shin Takarajima"	Nominated	
MTV Video Music Awards Japan	2019	Best Dance Video	"Wasurerarenai no"	Won	
MTV Video Music Awards Japan	2026	Best Creative Video	"Kaijū"	Won	
Music Awards Japan	2026	Song of the Year	"Kaijū"	Won	
Music Awards Japan	2026	Best Rock Song	"Kaijū"	Won	
Music Awards Japan	2026	Best Anime Song	"Kaijū"	Won	
Music Awards Japan	2026	Best Music Video	"Kaijū"	Won	
Music Awards Japan	2026	Best Cover Artwork	"Kaijū"	Won	
Music Awards Japan	2026	Best of Listeners' Choice	"Kaijū"	Nominated	
Music Awards Japan	2026	Artist of the Year	Sakanaction	Nominated	
Music Awards Japan	2026	Best Rock Band/Solo Artist	Sakanaction	Won	
Music Awards Japan	2026	Best Lighting Production Staff	Sakanaquarium 2025: Kaijū	Won	
Music Awards Japan	2026	Best Sound Production Staff	Sakanaquarium 2025: Kaijū	Won	
Reiwa Anison Awards	2025	Best Work Award	"Kaijū"	Won	
Reiwa Anison Awards	2025	Anikara Award	"Kaijū"	Nominated	
Space Shower Music Awards	2010	Best Conceptual Video	"Native Dancer"	Won	
Space Shower Music Awards	2011	Best Video of the Year	"Aruku Around"	Won	
Space Shower Music Awards	2011	Best Rock Video	"Aruku Around"	Won	
Space Shower Music Awards	2012	Best Video of the Year	"Bach no Senritsu o Yoru ni Kiita Sei Desu"	Won	
Space Shower Music Awards	2013	Best Artist	Sakanaction ("Boku to Hana" and "Yoru no Odoriko")	Won	
Space Shower Music Awards	2016	Best Group Artist	Sakanaction	Nominated	
Space Shower Music Awards	2016	Best Conceptual Video	"Shin Takarajima"	Won	
Space Shower Music Awards	2017	Best Groove Artist	Sakanaction	Nominated	
Space Shower Music Awards	2018	Best Live Production	Team Sakanaction	Won	
Space Shower Music Awards	2020	Best Group Artist	Sakanaction	Nominated	
Space Shower Music Awards	2020	Best Live Production	Sakanaction	Won	
Space Shower Music Awards	2020	Best Conceptual Video	"Wasurerarenai no"	Won	
The Television Drama Academy Awards	2014	Drama Song Award (July–September)	"Hasu no Hana"	Nominated	
The Television Drama Academy Awards	2019	Drama Song Award (July–September)	"Moth"	Nominated	
The Television Drama Academy Awards	2026	Drama Song Award (January–March)	"Iranai"	Nominated	
