= Sen to Rei =

Single by Sakanaction

from the album Shin-shiro
- Released: November 12, 2008
- Recorded: 2008
- Genre: New wave, rock
- Length: 3:51
- Label: BabeStar Label
- Songwriter: Ichiro Yamaguchi
- Producer: Sakanaction

Sakanaction singles chronology
"Night Fishing Is Good" (2007)	"Sen to Rei" (2008)	"Native Dancer" (2009)

"Sen to Rei" (Japanese: セントレイ; "1000 & 0") (Japanese pronunciation: [seɴ to ɾeː]) is a song by Japanese band Sakanaction. It was released as a digital download on November 12, 2008, and on December 10 was released as the band's first physical CD single.

== Background and development ==
Shin-shiro was the band's first album after joining the main Victor Entertainment roster and signing a contract with management group Hipland Management. In Spring 2009, the band moved to Tokyo from Hokkaido. The album was primarily created by band members in vocalist Ichiro Yamaguchi's apartment in Kawasaki, Kanagawa.

Before the band had moved to Tokyo in the spring of 2009, the song "Adventure" was originally planned to be the leading single from the album, in the place of "Sen to Rei". "Adventure" was written by Yamaguchi to consciously give the band a more accessible sound. Yamaguchi had intended to make music that blended underground and "high entertainment" pop music sounds on the band's first two studio albums, Go to the Future (2007) and Night Fishing (2008), however found that the band was predominantly seen as more underground than pop. Yamaguchi realized that in order to balance underground and "entertainment"-based pop music styles better, he needed to add more entertaining aspects. Yamaguchi considered "Adventure" the first step towards this sound, and challenged themselves to develop their popular sound more in "Sen to Rei". "Sen to Rei" became crucial to the creation of Shin-shiro, as the band created the entire album in response to the song, considering what aspects of Sakanaction's sound should listeners who had heard "Sen to Rei" hear, in order to experience all of Sakanction.

The single was the group's final release with BabeStar Label, before they moved onto Victor Entertainment's main roster. It was also the start of their relationship with stylist Hisashi "Momo" Kitazawa.

== Composition ==
"Sen to Rei"
Critics noted the changing vocals in the chorus of "Sen to Rei", and praised the song's dynamic sound.

"Sen to Rei" is a song recorded in common time, with a major key of E and set at a tempo of 132 beats per minute. It begins with an instrumental introduction, including guitars, bass guitars, keyboards and drums, with a strong "guitar rock" sound mixes with synthesizers. The verses begin with a chord progression of C♯m-A-Am-E, while the chorus begins with an Am-Emaj_{7}-G♯m-E-A progression.

The song's lyrics are written entirely in Japanese. The song's protagonist walks around at night-time, jet lagged after a night flight and "escaping the saddening night". He discovers he can see an "intertwined world" after counting to 1,000 on his hand. The final stanza of the lyrics discusses spatial dimensions: how "on the other side of 1000 and 0, and lines and points" he is a layered world, connecting him to another person.

== Writing and production ==
The song was inspired by Yamaguchi's ideas on four-dimensional space (pictured: a tesseract).

"Sen to Rei" was composed by Yamaguchi on the acoustic guitar, and was originally a much more sad and sentimental song. For Shin-shiro's album sessions, vocalist Yamaguchi tried a different approach to creating songs: after making the basic melody and lyrics, he assigned each of the members of Sakanction to a create a demo for one song each, and then developed the songs together. Kusakari was working on "Sen to Rei", and was the fastest to finish her demo, and the only member to bring a fully completed demo to her meeting with Yamaguchi. Yamaguchi asked Kusakari to make a "guitar rock"-style song, and asked her to make a song that teenagers would enjoy listening to.

The demo that Kusakari produced was much more rock than Yamaguchi had intended, as Yamaguchi had wanted to balance pop music with Sakanaction's underground dance sound. Eventually the band created a hybrid sound for the song, mixing guitar-based rock and electronica. The process of creating a guitar-based rock song reminded Kusakari of her teenager years before joining Sakanaction, when she performed in rock and punk bands in Sapporo. One of the techniques used by the band to make the song more pop was to increase the tempo to 138 BPM. Yamaguchi initially felt embarrassed that the band were able to create such a pop song, however after the song's release found that the band's audience responded well to the style, the band integrated the pop style found on "Sen to Rei" into the band's music, eventually becoming a central part of Sakanaction's musical identity.

Yamaguchi's lyrics for the song were inspired by space and space in the style of the manga Galaxy Express 999. He based his lyrics on his ideas of what four-dimensional space would be like, considering the fourth dimension to be imagination running inside minds. The use of a large number and a number used to represent nothingness in the title "Sen to Rei" was meant to express the relative difference between each spatial dimension: changing from a single point, to a line, to a 3D object.

Originally the band did not intend to release "Sen to Rei" as a physical single, but during its production they realized that the song was more appropriate to be released as a single, rather than simply as an album track. The band created the three tracks on the physical single to complement each other, in the style of an extended play more so than a stand-alone single track with B-sides. While "Sen to Rei" was written attempting to bridge popular and underground sounds, "Ame (A)" was written as a straightforward pop song, and "Modokashii Hibi" as an underground song. "Ame (A)" was an attempt by the band to create a "pop Sakanaction" sound, where Yamaguchi attempted to create story-like lyrics, and the band worked on a 1970s kayōkyoku-inspired retro sound. "Modokashii Hibi" featured aspects of the band's sound that were not present in "Sen to Rei" that they wanted to show off to new listeners. The recording features the sound of a metal bucket that Yamaguchi purchased. Part way through recording, the bucket's handle broke off, and this sound as well as Iwadera laughing were included in the final mix of the song.

== Promotion and release ==
The song was first unveiled during the band's festival performance at the Rising Sun Rock Festival in Otaru on August 16, 2008. The song was promoted on the Toyama Television program BBT Music Selection as its opening theme music, and was put into heavy rotation by the Nippon TV music program Music Fighter. The song was put into heavy rotation by music stations across Japan in December, and the music video in heavy rotation by MTV Japan. Sakanaction made radio appearances in December, on FM Osaka, FM802, FM Hokkaido and FM North Wave, and were featured in the November and December issues of the magazines B-Pass, Nikkei Entertainment!, Kansai Walker, Musica and Rockin' On Japan.

To promote the single, Sakanaction performed two live concerts in the same day at the Cube Garden in Sapporo: Rei Live (REI（零）LIVE) in the afternoon and Sen Live (SEN（千）LIVE) in the evening of December 20, 2008. Following the theme of naming the live concert after the song title, Sen Live had an entry fee of 1,000 yen, while Rei Live was free for entrants who applied with a form attached to the "Sen to Rei" single.

The song is a frequent part of Sakanaction's live concert sets, and live recordings of the song have been released by the band six times: in the bonus track on the "Aruku Around" (2010) single featuring audio of three songs from the Sakanaquarium 2009 concert in Sapporo, twice on their Sanakaquarium 2010 DVD set, as performed at the Kikuuiki tour final at the Shinkiba Studio Coast on May 15, 2010 and at their Nippon Budokan concert on October 8, 2010, as well as on their Sakanaquarium 2011 video album, Sakanaquarium 2012 "Zepp Alive" digital live album and their Sakanatribe 2014 video album releases.

The song was compiled as the opening track on Getting Better 15th Anniversary presents Getting Roll: Rock Anthem Mix, a CD mixed by rock DJ Minoru Katahira celebrating fifteen years of the Getting Better rock event. Both "Ame (A)" and "Modokashii Hibi" were compiled on the Tsuki no Namigata disc of the band's compilation album Natsukashii Tsuki wa Atarashii Tsuki: Coupling & Remix Works (2015).

== Music video ==
The music video for the song was directed by Keitaro Toyoda. It features all five members of Sakanaction performing the song in the dark. This is followed by scenes of the camera moving towards a bright light source, with the band members juxtaposed onto the beams. Toyoda was inspired to create the video after hearing of the song's themes, and depicted the band travelling from the first to the fourth dimension. Yamaguchi asked Toyoda to specifically emphasize the rock and human aspects of the song and the band, rather than the electronic sound.

== Critical reception ==
Sakiko Okazaki of Rockin' On Japan praised the song's high-pitched synthesizers, fast-paced guitars, groovy bass and heart-hitting drums, and felt the song expressed the vigor of Sakanaction. CDJournal reviewers felt "Sen to Rei" expressed loneliness, and praised the new Sakanaction-style guitar rock, as well as their ever-changing style. The reviewers were impressed with Yamaguchi's chorus vocals, which changed from "subtle and tender to hopeful and empowered", and called the song a "fast-paced killer tune". They noted that the song was not very "showy", however felt that despite this, Sakanaction still expressed a "high quality hybrid" sound. Kuniko Yamada of Bounce praised the song's "sprinting feeling", and noted how Sakanaction were comfortable with creating more standard "guitar rock" songs as well. Entertainment Media Kulture named "Sample" as one of Sakanaction's early signature songs, feeling that the uptempo song positively worked against Sakanaction's prior image as a band.

Reviewing the single as a whole, Okazaki described the B-sides as having "room temperature dance beats", and felt that they sounded fresh, in comparison to the highly powered "Sen to Rei".

== Track listings ==
Digital download
No.	Title	Length
1.	"Sen to Rei"	3:51
Total length:		3:51

All tracks are written by Ichiro Yamaguchi.

Single
No.	Title	Length
1.	"Sen to Rei"	3:51
2.	"Ame (A)" ("Rain (A)")	3:31
3.	"Modokashii Hibi" (もどかしい日々, "Irritating Days")	5:07
Total length:		12:29

Limited edition bonus track
No.	Title	Length
4.	"Yoru no Higashigawa ('Night Fishing Is Good' Tour in Sapporo)" (夜の東側, "East of the Night")	4:16
Total length:		16:45

== Personnel ==
Personnel details for the song were sourced from Shin-shiro's liner notes booklet, while music video personnel were sourced from Sakanarchive 2007—2011: Sakanaction Music Video Collection.

Sakanaction

- All members – arrangement, production
- Keiichi Ejima – drums
- Motoharu Iwadera – guitar
- Ami Kusakari – bass guitar
- Emi Okazaki – keyboards
- Ichiro Yamaguchi – vocals, guitar, lyrics, composition

Personnel

- Toshihiko Fujimi – executive producer
- Kentaro Ishikawa – A&R
- Satoshi Kamata – executive producer
- Tatsuya Nomura – executive producer (Hip Land Music Corporation)
- Masashi Uramoto – mixing, recording
- Wataru Woka – A&R

Music video personnel

- Cromagnon – production company
- Kenji Ishida – hair, make-up
- Hisashi "Momo" Kitazawa – stylist
- Masaya Nakahara – cameraman
- Sakanaction – cast
- Takashi Sugai – producer
- Keitarō Toyoda – director
- Kazuhiro Yokobori – lighting

== Charts ==
Chart (2008)	Peak position
Japan Billboard Adult Contemporary Airplay	45
Japan Billboard Japan Hot 100	9
Japan Oricon weekly singles	35

== Sales and certifications ==
Chart	Amount
Oricon physical sales	6,000

== Release history ==
Region	Date	Format	Distributing Label	Catalog codes
Japan	November 12, 2008	ringtone, digital download	BabeStar Label	VEAML-22686
Japan	December 10, 2008	CD single, limited edition CD single	BabeStar Label	VICB-35013, VICB-35014
Japan	December 17, 2008	rental CD single	BabeStar Label	VICB-35013, VICB-35014
South Korea	April 13, 2009	digital download (EP)	J-Box Entertainment	—N/a
