= Native Dancer (song) =

- Digital download cover, featuring the pair of sneakers shown in the song's music video.

Single by Sakanaction

from the album Shin-shiro
- Released: January 7, 2009
- Recorded: 2008
- Genre: New wave, rock, dance
- Length: 4:25
- Label: Victor Entertainment
- Songwriter: Ichiro Yamaguchi
- Producer: Sakanaction

Sakanaction singles chronology
"Sen to Rei" (2008)	"Native Dancer" (2009)	"Aruku Around" (2010)

"Native Dancer" (Japanese: ネイティブダンサー, Hepburn: Neitibu Dansā) (Japanese pronunciation: [neitibudansa:]) is a song by Japanese band Sakanaction. It was released on January 7, 2009 as a digital single from the band's third album Shin-shiro. Its accompanying music video directed by Yuichi Kodama was a critical success, winning the best conceptual video award at the 2010 Space Shower Music Video Awards.

In 2010, the song was remixed by electronic musician Rei Harakami for inclusion on the band's "Aruku Around" single. This would become one of Harakami's final releases before his death in July 2011.

== Background and development ==
After releasing two albums based in Hokkaido under the BabeStar Label sublabel of Victor Entertainment, Sakanaction signed a contract with management group Hipland Management and joined the main Victor Entertainment band roster, moving from Hokkaido to Tokyo in the spring of 2008. The album was primarily created by band members in vocalist Ichiro Yamaguchi's apartment in Kawasaki, Kanagawa. In December, Sakanaction released their first physical single "Sen to Rei", which became the band's first top 40 release.

== Composition ==
"Native Dancer"
The change from a piano-based song to an electronic dance song in "Native Dancer" was praised by CDJournal critics.

"Native Dancer" is a song in verse–chorus form, recorded in common time with a major key of D major and a minor key of B minor. The tempo is set at 130BPM, and the song has a length of four minutes and twenty-five seconds. The song opens with a piano instrumental progression of G6-Asus4-Bm7, which remains constant throughout the verses and choruses until the song's end in an instrumental coda. The song additionally features an arrangement of drums, guitar, bass guitar and synths. The song's lyrics feature a protagonist looking back sadly on a relationship, likening painful memories to a winter flower.

== Writing and production ==
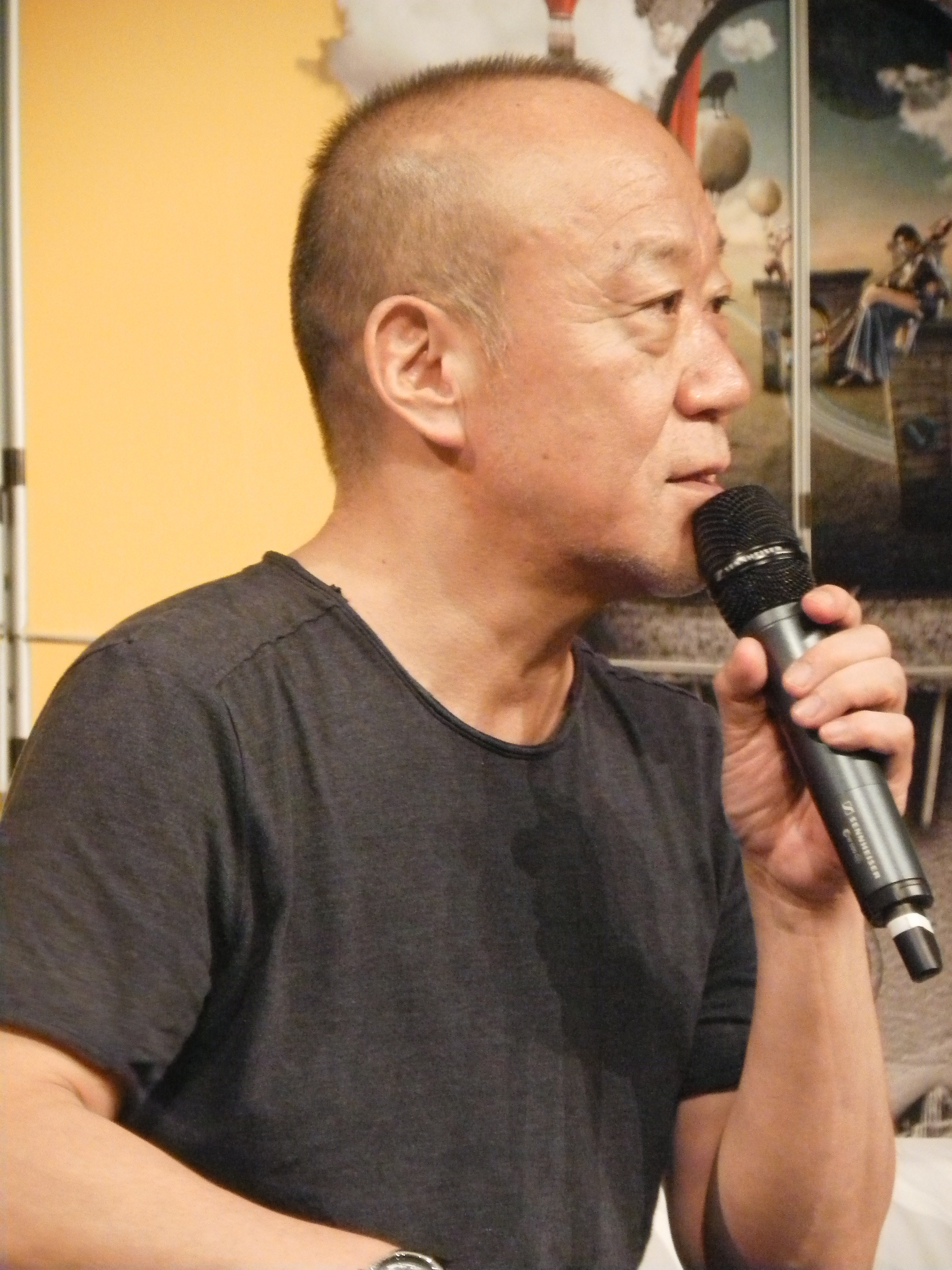
"Native Dancer" was inspired by the music of Japanese composer Joe Hisaishi.

For Shin-shiro, Yamaguchi asked each member to work individually on creating demos for songs, and after each song had been developed, the band would record the songs together. "Native Dancer", however, was worked on solely by Yamaguchi. Yamaguchi wanted to create a song that began with only vocals backed by piano, that progressed into a techno song, and wanted to create a song that would express the differences between studio and live performances. The song was built around the four-chord piano introduction, and Yamaguchi was inspired to make something with a Joe Hisaishi-feel. Due to the lack of input by other members of the band, Yamaguchi felt like the song was his own song instead of a Sakanaction song, merely performed by the band, and that the creation process was like Yamaguchi's days performing as a DJ before forming Sakanaction.

== Promotion and release ==
The song served as the leading promotional track from Shin-shiro. It began being played on Adult Contemporary radio stations in mid January. Nationally, radio play for the song peaked in early January, with the song being most successful at adult contemporary radio stations, however in the band's native Hokkaido, the song only started receiving airplay then. On North Wave's Sapporo Hot 100 chart that tracks airplay, requests and sales in Hokkaido, the song peaked at number three for two weeks in mid-February.

The song was remixed by Japanese musician Rei Harakami in 2010 as "Native Dancer (Rei Harakami Heppoko Re-Arrange)" (rei harakami へっぽこre-arrange; "Rei Harakami's Amateur Re-Arrangement"), which was released on the band's next single "Aruku Around" (2010). Yamaguchi became a fan of Harakami's after encountering his Lust (2005) album while he worked at a record store, and immediately thought of Harakami when Sakanaction's team discussed including a remix on their "Aruku Around" single.

The song is a frequent part of Sakanaction's live concert sets, and live recordings of the song have been released by the band seven times: in the bonus track on the "Aruku Around" single featuring audio of three songs from the Sakanaquarium 2009 concert in Sapporo, twice on their Sanakaquarium 2010 DVD set, as performed at the Kikuuiki tour final at the Shinkiba Studio Coast on May 15, 2010 and at their Nippon Budokan concert on October 8, 2010. It was performed in the encore of their Sakanaquarium 2011 video album, and was part of the set from their Sakanaquarium 2012 concert compiled on the bonus DVD of the "Yoru no Odoriko" (2012) single (later found on their Sakanaquarium 2012 "Zepp Alive" live album). The song was rearranged for the band's Sakanaquarium 2013 concert, that was recorded live at the Makuhari Messe on May 19, 2013.

The song was compiled on Ichiro Yatsui's second mixtape Atarashii Yatsu! in June 2010, as well as on Fantastic Plastic Machine's compilation Versus. Japanese Rock vs. FPM in August of the same year. "Native Dancer (Rei Harakami Heppoko Re-Arrange)" was compiled on the band's compilation album Natsukashii Tsuki wa Atarashii Tsuki: Coupling & Remix Works (2015).

== Music video ==
The music video for the song was directed by Yuichi Kodama, as well as choreography by Furitsuke Kagyou Air:man and styling by Hisashi "Momo" Kitazawa. The video was created by the team who won one of the three grand prix awards at the 2008 Cannes Lions advertisement festival, for work on Uniqlo's Uniqulock campaign. The video features two main scenes: mid-shots of Ichiro Yamaguchi from the waist up, as well as shots of a pair of legs of a dancer from Furitsuke Kagyou Air:man, wearing a discontinued pair of Nike Air Force 180 Clerks Pack sneakers. The dancer performs an intricate footwork routine inspired by techtonik and C-Walk dance styles, interspersed with the scenes depicting Yamaguchi.

The video was released online to YouTube on January 7, 2009. It was viewed over 40,000 times in the first 13 days, and a year later had been watched more than one million times. It was shown during Creative Symposium 2009, an event held over five days in March 2009 in Tokyo to celebrate visual arts, as well as at the Los Angeles Film Festival in June 2010, as a part of a showcase entitled Big in Japan: A Survey of Japanese Music Videos. At the 2010 Space Shower Music Video Awards, the video won the best conceptual video award, and director Yuichi Kodama the overall best director award.

Sakanaction has collaborated with choreographers Furitsuke Kagyou Air:man twice since the release of the video: on the videos for "Bach no Senritsu o Yoru ni Kiita Sei Desu." (2011) and "Sayonara wa Emotion" (2014).

== Critical reception ==
Critics at CDJournal called the song a "rhythmic dance tune", praising the juxtaposition in the song between its danceable rhythm and lyrics which expressed a "painful feeling of not being able to get away from your thoughts". They were impressed with how the song transitioned from a "nostalgic piano drifting in nihilism" to a synthesizer sound, as well as the sad violin that "expressed the painfulness of autumn". Kuniko Yamada of Bounce similarly praised the song's "beautiful fusion of acoustic and synth sounds". Entertainment Media Kulture described "Native Dancer" as one of the band's early signature songs, feeling that the song's wordplay was fun, and that the lyrics had a high aesthetic sense.

Reviewing the Rei Harakami remix, CDJournal felt that this version had a "floating, light sound that makes you feel at ease", and that there was something nostalgic about the remix that matched the song's lyrics on transience well. Kenji Sasaki of Skream! described the remix as "beauty and strangeness twist and fight each other, while being wrapped up in Yamaguchi's lyrics."

== Track listing ==
"Native Dancer" digital download
No.	Title	Length
1.	"Native Dancer"	4:25
Total length:		4:25

== Personnel ==
Personnel details for the song were sourced from Shin-shiro's liner notes booklet, while music video personnel were sourced from Sakanarchive 2007—2011: Sakanaction Music Video Collection.

Sakanaction

- All members – arrangement, production
- Keiichi Ejima – drums
- Motoharu Iwadera – guitar
- Ami Kusakari – bass guitar
- Emi Okazaki – keyboards
- Ichiro Yamaguchi – vocals, guitar, lyrics, composition

Personnel

- Toshihiko Fujimi – executive producer
- Kentaro Ishikawa – A&R
- Satoshi Kamata – executive producer
- Tatsuya Nomura – executive producer (Hip Land Music Corporation)
- Yuzuru Tomita – cooperative keyboard arrangement
- Masashi Uramoto – mixing, recording
- Wataru Woka – A&R

Music video personnel

- Furitsuke Kagyou Air:man – choreography
- Daisuke Hiraga – producer
- Hisashi "Momo" Kitazawa – creative director, stylist
- Yuichi Kodama – director
- Tetsu Moritera – lighting
- Masaya Nakahara – cameraman
- P.I.C.S. – production company

== Charts ==
Chart (2009)	Peak position
Japan Billboard Adult Contemporary Airplay	43
Japan Billboard Japan Hot 100	60

== Certifications ==
Region	Certification	Certified units/sales
Japan (RIAJ) Digital	Gold	100,000^{*}
^{*} Sales figures based on certification alone.

== Release history ==
Region	Date	Format	Distributing Label	Catalog codes
Japan	January 7, 2009	ringtone, digital download	Victor Entertainment	VEAML-22827
