= Sakanaction discography =

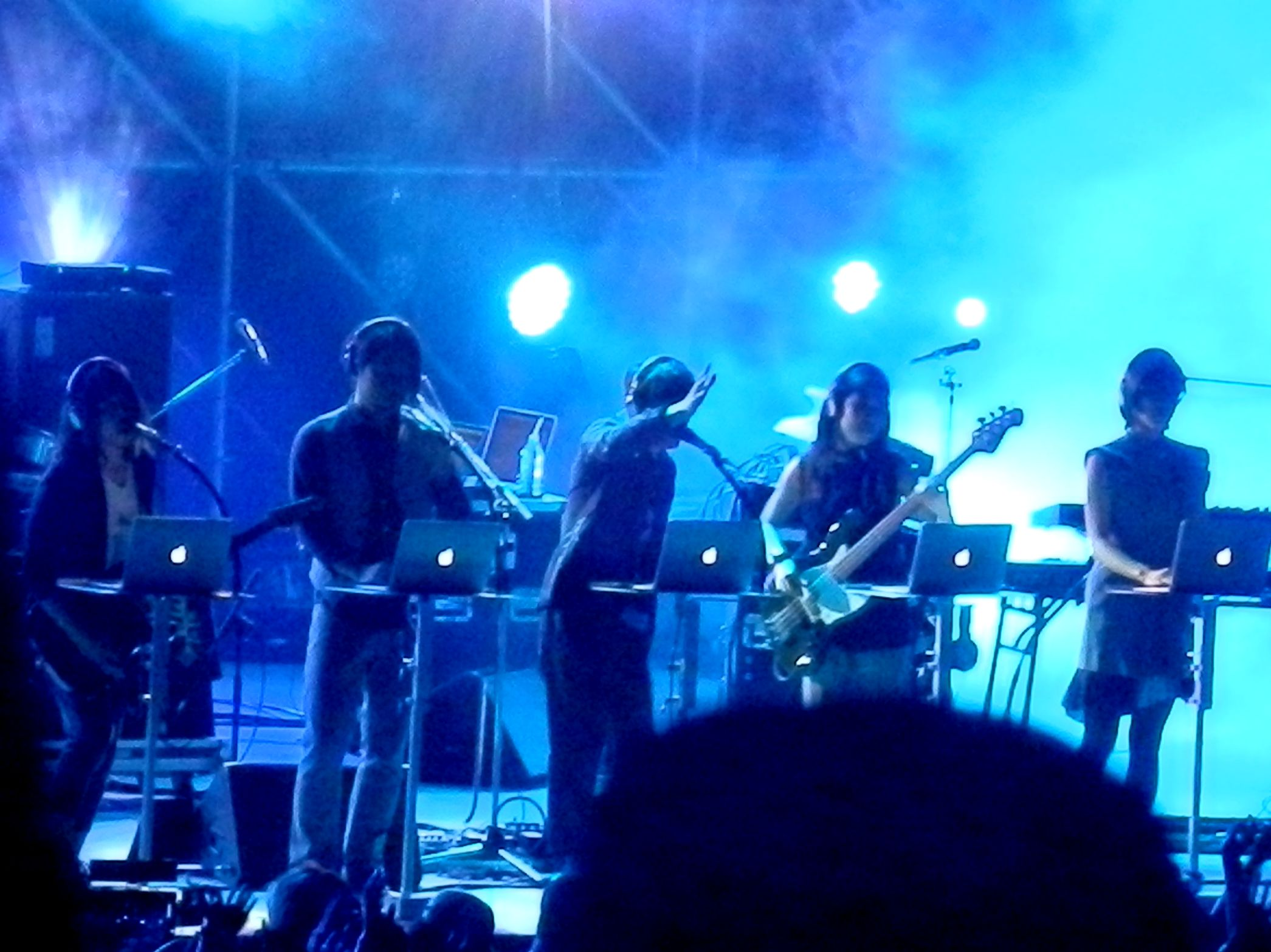
- Sakanaction performing at Iwamizawa, Hokkaido in 2013
- Studio albums: 6
- Extended plays: 4
- Soundtrack albums: 1
- Live albums: 1
- Compilation albums: 1
- Singles: 17
- Promotional singles: 9
- Video albums: 6
- Music videos: 27

The discography of Japanese band Sakanaction includes six studio albums, eight singles, four video releases, and multiple digital downloads. Since their 2007 debut, all of Sakanaction's releases have been released under Victor Entertainment in Japan. Sakanaction currently have two albums certified gold by the RIAJ, Documentaly (2011) and Sakanaction (2013). Four songs by Sakanaction have been certified gold by the RIAJ for digital downloads, and their single "Good-Bye" / "Eureka" (2014) reached number two on Oricon's singles chart.

== Studio albums ==
List of albums, with selected chart positions
Title	Album details	Peak chart positions	Sales (JPN) (Note: Sales provided by Oricon database and are rounded to the nearest thousand copies.)	Certifications
Title	Album details	JPN	Sales (JPN)	Certifications
Go to the Future	Released: May 9, 2007; Label: Victor Entertainment; Formats: CD, digital download, LP	55 (Note: 2015 position. Initially charted at number 105 in its initial run.)	7,000	
Night Fishing	Released: January 23, 2008; Label: Victor; Formats: CD, digital download, LP	53	9,000	
Shin-shiro (シンシロ)	Released: January 21, 2009; Label: Victor; Formats: CD, digital download, LP	8	34,000	
Kikuuiki	Released: March 17, 2010; Label: Victor; Formats: CD, digital download, LP	3	59,000	
Documentaly	Released: September 28, 2011; Label: Victor; Formats: CD, CD/DVD, digital download, LP	2	102,000	RIAJ: Gold
Sakanaction	Released: March 13, 2013; Label: Victor; Formats: CD, CD/DVD, CD/Blu-ray, digital download, LP	1	176,000	RIAJ: Gold
834.194	Released: June 19, 2019; Label: Victor; Formats: CD, CD/DVD, CD/Blu-ray, digital download	2	118,000	RIAJ: Gold
Adapt (アダプト)	Released: March 30, 2022; Label: Victor; Formats: CD, digital download	4	30,452	
"—" denotes a recording that did not chart or was not released in that territory.

== Compilation albums ==
List of albums, with selected chart positions
Title	Album details	Peak chart positions	Sales (JPN)	Certifications
Title	Album details	JPN	Sales (JPN)	Certifications
Natsukashii Tsuki wa Atarashii Tsuki: Coupling & Remix Works (懐かしい月は新しい月 ～Coupling & Remix works～)	Released: August 5, 2015; Label: Victor; Formats: 2CD, 2CD/DVD, 2CD/Blu-ray	5	34,000	
Sakanazukan (魚図鑑)	Released: March 28, 2018; Label: Victor; Formats: 2CD, 2CD/DVD, 2CD/Blu-ray, 3CD	1	129,000	RIAJ: Gold

== Live albums ==
Title	Album details
Sakanaquarium 2012: Zepp Alive	Released: November 14, 2012; Label: Victor; Formats: Digital download

== Soundtracks ==
Title	Album details
Motion Music of Bakuman (Note: Compiled as a bonus disc on versions of the band's "Shin Takarajima" single.)	Soundtrack for the live action film adaptation of Bakuman (2015); Released: September 30, 2015; Label: Victor; Formats: CD

== Extended plays ==
List of extended plays, with selected chart positions
Title	Album details	Peak positions	Sales (JPN)
Title	Album details	JPN	Sales (JPN)
'Night Fishing Is Good' Tour 2008 in Sapporo	Live EP; Released: August 6, 2008; Label: Victor; Formats: Digital download	—	
Remixion	Remix EP; Released: October 15, 2008; Label: Victor; Formats: Digital download	—	
"Fish Alive" 30min., 1 Sequence by 6 Songs Sakanaquarium 2009 @ Sapporo	Live EP; Released: July 15, 2009; Label: Victor; Formats: Digital download	—	
Inori EP	Remix EP; Released: June 26, 2013; Label: Victor; Formats: Vinyl	36	3,000
"—" denotes a recording that did not chart or was not released in that territory.

== Singles ==
List of singles, with selected chart positions
Title	Year	Peak chart positions			Sales (JPN)	Certifications	Album
Title	Year	JPN Oricon	JPN Hot	WW	Sales (JPN)	Certifications	Album
"Word" (ワード)	2007	—	—	—			Night Fishing
"Sample" (サンプル)	2007	—	—	—			Night Fishing
"Night Fishing Is Good" (ナイトフィッシングイズグッド)	2007	—	—	—			Night Fishing
"Sen to Rei" (セントレイ)	2008	35	9	—	6,000		Shin-shiro
"Native Dancer" (ネイティブダンサー)	2009	—	60	—		RIAJ: Gold (dig.)	Shin-shiro
"Aruku Around" (アルクアラウンド)	2010	3	4	—	27,000	RIAJ: Platinum (dig.); Gold (st.)	Kikuuiki
"Identity" (アイデンティティ)	2010	12	7	—	21,000	RIAJ: Platinum (dig.); Platinum (st.)	Documentaly
"Rookie" (ルーキー)	2011	6	7	—	17,000		Documentaly
"Bach no Senritsu o Yoru ni Kiita Sei Desu" (『バッハの旋律を夜に聴いたせいです。』)	2011	8	4	—	23,000	RIAJ: Gold (dig.)	Documentaly
"Boku to Hana" (僕と花)	2012	6	3	—	26,000	RIAJ: Gold (dig.)	Sakanaction
"Yoru no Odoriko" (夜の踊り子)	2012	5	2	—	48,000	RIAJ: Platinum (dig.); Platinum (st.)	Sakanaction
"Music" (ミュージック)	2013	4	1	—	55,000	RIAJ: Platinum (dig.); Platinum (st.)	Sakanaction
"Good-Bye" (グッドバイ)	2014	2	2	—	32,000		834.194
"Eureka" (ユリイカ)	2014	2	4	—	32,000		834.194
"Hasu no Hana" (蓮の花)	2014	4	12	—	27,000		834.194
"Sayonara wa Emotion" (さよならはエモーション)	2014	4	4	—	27,000		834.194
"Shin Takarajima" (新宝島)	2015	9	1	—	35,000	RIAJ: 2× Platinum (dig.); 2× Platinum (st.)	Sakanazukan and 834.194
"Tabun, Kaze" (多分、風。)	2016	4	6	—	33,000	RIAJ: Gold (dig.); Gold (st.)	834.194
"Wasurerarenai no" (忘れられないの)	2019	7	5	—	14,778	RIAJ: Platinum (st.)	834.194
"Moth" (モス)	2019	7	28	—	14,778	RIAJ: Gold (st.)	834.194
"Plateau" (プラトー)	2021	—	60	—			Adapt
"Shock!" (ショック!)	2022	—	35	—			Adapt
"Kaijū" (怪獣)	2025	5	2	96	28,569	RIAJ: 3× Platinum (st.)	Non-album singles
"Iranai" (いらない)	2026	5	10	—	28,569		Non-album singles
"—" denotes a recording that did not chart or was not released in that territory.

== Promotional singles ==
List of singles, with selected chart positions
Title	Year	Peak chart positions	Certification	Album
Title	Year	JPN Hot	Certification	Album
"Mikazuki Sunset" (三日月サンセット)	2007	—		Go to the Future
"Shiranami Top Water" (白波トップウォーター)	2007	—		Go to the Future
"Me ga Aku Aiiro" (目が明く藍色)	2010	92		Kikuuiki
"Endless" (エンドレス)	2011	8		Documentaly
"Aoi"	2013	27	RIAJ: Gold (dig.); Gold (st.)	Sakanaction
"Inori"	2013	— (Note: Charted at number 31 on the Billboard Hot Single Sales sub-chart.)		Sakanaction
"Holy Dance" (ホーリーダンス) (Note: Originally recorded on the "Identity" single in 2010.)	2015	— (Note: Charted at number 62 on the Billboard Radio Songs chart.)		Natsukashii Tsuki wa Atarashii Tsuki
"Kagerō (Movie Version)" (陽炎)	2018	24		Sakanazukan
"Nylon no Ito" (ナイロンの糸)	2019	53		834.194
"—" denotes a recording that did not chart or was not released in that territory.

== Other charted songs ==
List of songs, with selected chart positions
Title	Year	Peak chart positions		Album
Title	Year	JPN Hot (Note: Sources for chart positions are as follows: "Sen to Rei", "Native Dancer", "Aruku Around", "Me ga Aku Aiiro", "Identity", "Rookie", "Bach no Senritsu o Yoru ni Kiita Sei Desu", "Endless", "Boku to Hana", "Yoru no Odoriko", "Music", "Aoi", "Eureka", "Good-Bye", "Hasu no Hana", "Sayonara wa Emotion", "Shin Takarajima", "Tabun, Kaze", "Moon", "Kagerō (Movie Version)", "Nylon no Ito", "Wasurerarenai no", "Moth", "Plateau", "Shock!", "Kaiju", "Iranai".)	JPN Streaming (Note: Sources for chart positions are as follows: "Kikitakatta Dance Music, Liquid Room ni" and "Match to Peanuts": "September":)	Album
"Nantettatte Haru" (なんてったって春)	2013	— (Note: Charted at number 72 on the Billboard Adult Contemporary Airplay sub-chart.)	—	Sakanaction
"Kikitakatta Dance Music, Liquid Room ni" (「聴きたかったダンスミュージック、リキッドルームに」)	2015	—	76 (Note: Charted in 2019.)	"Shin Takarajima" (single)
"Moon"	2016	98	—	"Tabun, Kaze" (single)
"Match to Peanuts" (マッチとピーナッツ)	2019	—	40	834.194
"September" (セプテンバー)	2019	—	68	834.194
"Tsuki no Wan" (月の碗)	2022	37	—	Adapt
"—" denotes a recording that did not chart or was not released in that territory.

== Video albums ==
=== Music video albums ===
List of media, with selected chart positions
Title	Album details	Peak positions	
Title	Album details	JPN DVD	JPN Blu-ray
Sakanarchive 2007–2011: Sakanaction Music Video Collection	Released: December 14, 2011; Label: Victor; Formats: DVD, Blu-ray	10	88

=== Live albums ===
List of media, with selected chart positions
Title	Album details	Peak positions	
Title	Album details	JPN DVD	JPN Blu-ray
Sakanaquarium 2010 (B)	Released: February 2, 2011; Label: Victor; Formats: DVD, Blu-ray	14	92
Sakanaquarium 2010 (C)	Released: February 2, 2011; Label: Victor; Formats: DVD, Blu-ray	15	104
Sakanaquarium 2011 Documentaly: Live at Makuhari Messe	Released: March 28, 2012; Label: Victor; Formats: DVD, Blu-ray	14	3
Sakanaquarium 2013 Sakanaction: Live at Makuhari Messe 2013.5.19	Released: November 13, 2013; Label: Victor; Formats: DVD, Blu-ray	4	2
Sakanatribe 2014: Live at Tokyo Dome City Hall	Released: July 30, 2014; Label: Victor; Formats: DVD, Blu-ray	6	5
Sakanaquarium 2015–2016: NF Records Launch Tour	Released: May 25, 2016; Label: NF Records; Formats: DVD, Blu-ray	4	3
Sakanaquarium 2019 "834.194" 6.1ch Sound Around Arena Session: Live at Portmesse Nagoya 2019.06.14	Released: January 15, 2020; Label: NF Records; Formats: DVD, Blu-ray	6	3
Sakanaquarium Hikari Online (光; "Light")	Released: March 17, 2021; Label: NF Records; Formats: DVD, Blu-ray	9	2
Sakanaquarium Adapt Online (アダプト)	Released: February 22, 2023; Label: NF Records; Formats: DVD, Blu-ray	12	5
Sakanaquarium 2024 "turn"	Released: March 26, 2025; Label: NF Records; Formats: DVD, Blu-ray	8	1
Sakanaquarium 2025 "Kaiju" (怪獣; "Monster")	Released: March 25, 2026; Label: NF Records; Formats: DVD, Blu-ray	4	2

== Music videos ==
Title	Director(s)	Originating album	Year	Ref.
"Mikazuki Sunset"	Yoshihiro Mori	Go to the Future	2007	
"Shiranami Top Water"	Hiroshi Kondō	Go to the Future	2007	
"Word"	Hiroshi Kondō	Night Fishing Is Good	2007	
"Sample"	Kanji Sutō	Night Fishing Is Good	2007	
"Night Fishing Is Good"	Yoshihiro Mori	Night Fishing Is Good	2008	
"Sen to Rei"	Keitarō Toyoda	Shin-shiro	2008	
"Native Dancer"	Yuichi Kodama	Shin-shiro	2009	
"Aruku Around"	Kazuaki Seki	Kikuuiki	2010	
"Me ga Aku Aiiro"	Daisuke Shimada	Kikuuiki	2010	
"Identity"	Hisashi "Momo" Kitazawa	Documentaly	2010	
"Montage"	Daisuke Shimada	—N/a	2010	
"Rookie"	Daisuke Shimada	Documentaly	2011	
"Bach no Senritsu o Yoru ni Kiita Sei Desu"	Yūsuke Tanaka	Documentaly	2011	
"Endless"	Takumi Shiga, Hisashi "Momo" Kitazawa	Documentaly	2011	
"Document" (ドキュメント, Dokyumento)	Yasuyuki Yamaguchi	Documentaly	2011	
"Boku to Hana"	Yasuyuki Yamaguchi	Sakanaction	2012	
"Yoru no Odoriko"	Yūsuke Tanaka	Sakanaction	2012	
"Music"	Kazuaki Seki	Sakanaction	2013	
"Inori (Extended Mix)"	Yasuyuki Yamaguchi	Sakanaction	2013	
"Eureka"	Yasuyuki Yamaguchi	834.194	2014	
"Good-Bye"	Yukihiro Shoda, Hisashi "Momo" Kitazawa	834.194	2014	
"Hasu no Hana"	Yasuyuki Yamaguchi	834.194	2014	
"Sayonara wa Emotion"	Yūsuke Tanaka	834.194	2014	
"Years"	Tomokazu Yamada	Natsukashii Tsuki wa Atarashii Tsuki	2015	
"Slow Motion" (スローモーション, Surō Mōshon)	Yoshiyuki Okuyama	Natsukashii Tsuki wa Atarashii Tsuki	2015	
"Holy Dance"	Ichiro Yamaguchi	Natsukashii Tsuki wa Atarashii Tsuki	2015	
"Shin Takarajima"	Yūsuke Tanaka	834.194	2015	
"Tabun, Kaze"	Yūsuke Tanaka	834.194	2016	
"SORATO"	Tomokazu Yamada	—N/a	2017	
"Nylon no Ito"	Tomokazu Yamada	834.194	2019	
"Wasurerarenai no"	Yūsuke Tanaka	834.194	2019	
"Moth"	Yasuyuki Yamaguchi	834.194	2019	
"Plateau"	Yūsuke Tanaka	Adapt	2021	
"Shock!"	Yūsuke Tanaka	Adapt	2022	
