= Sakanaquarium Hikari Online =

2020 livestreamed concert by Sakanaction

- Online concert by Sakanaction
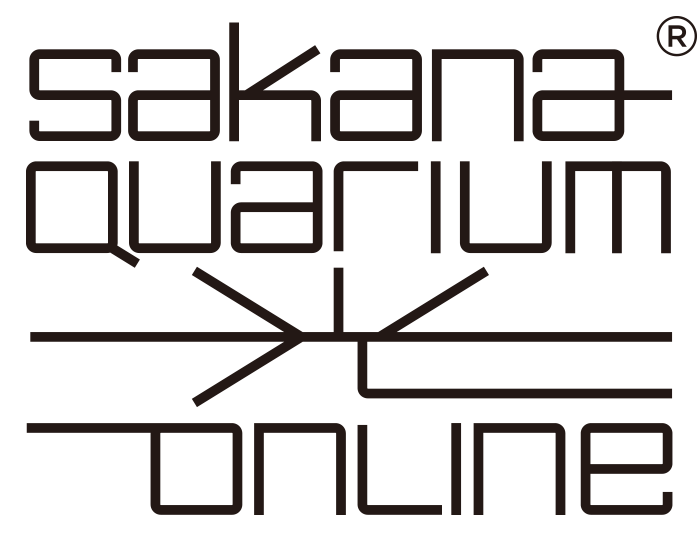
- Associated album: 834.194
- Date: August 15–16, 2020
- No. of shows: 2
- Attendance: 60,000 (live viewership)
- Website: sakanaction.jp/feature/sakanaquarium_online

Sakanaction concert chronology
- Sakanaquarium 2020: 834.194 Hikari (2020); Sakanaquarium Hikari Online (2020); Sakanaquarium Adapt Online (2021)

Sakanaquarium Hikari Online (Note: Hepburn: Sakanakuariumu: Hikari Onrain (Japanese: SAKANAQUARIUM 光 ONLINE; lit. 'Fish-Aquarium Light Online')) was the first online concert by the Japanese rock band Sakanaction. It was livestreamed on August 15, 2020, for members of the band's fan club, and again to general ticket holders on August 16. The online concerts were organized after the cancelation of the band's 2020 tour, in support of their seventh album 834.194 (2019), as a result of the COVID-19 pandemic. The band worked with art director Yusuke Tanaka with the goal of transforming online concerts — which had become commonplace during the pandemic — into a new genre of media, rather than a replacement to in-person performances.

Hikari Online was filmed at the Chiba studio of set design company Shimizu Octo and was performed entirely live. The setlist, consisting twenty songs across two hours, was divided into two segments: the former deep and mid-tempo, and the latter upbeat. The transition between the two acts was marked by the main stage moving to a second set. The staging also included smoke, laser lights, various lightning techniques, and real-time visual effects by the creative collective Rhizomatiks.

Japanese music publications praised Hikari Online for Sakanaction's artistic exploration of the online concert. Commercially, the August 16 show for general ticket holders was watched live by around 60,000 people. A video album of the concert was released to Blu-ray and DVD on March 17, 2021, and its limited editions included a bonus documentary.

== Background ==
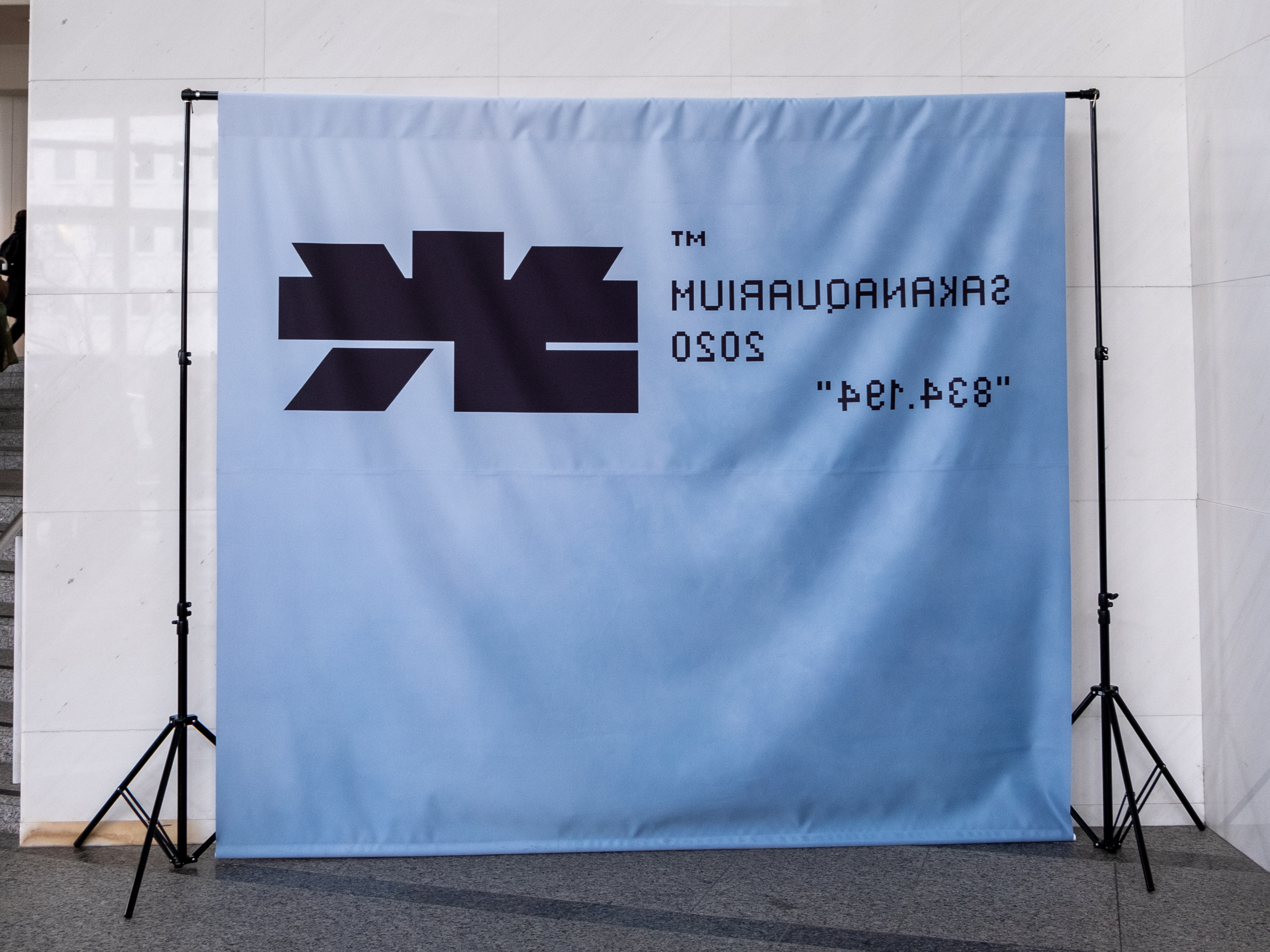
Following the midway cancelation of their 2020 tour (photo panel pictured) due to the COVID-19 pandemic, Sakanaction organized Hikari Online as a remote concert in its place.

The Japanese rock band Sakanaction released their seventh studio album, 834.194, in June 2019, and performed an accompanying tour, Sakanaquarium 2019: 834.194 – 6.1ch Sound Around Arena Session, between April 2019 and June. Equipped with over 300 additional speakers to improve the sound quality of the venues, the final show at the Portmesse Nagoya attracted over 100,000 people in attendance. A second touring effort for the album, Sakanaquarium 2020: 834.194 Hikari, was originally scheduled with 23 shows, spanning from January 2020 until April, with three additional shows in May. This tour was sold out and went underway in January as intended, until restrictions implemented amid the COVID-19 pandemic caused remaining shows from February to be delayed and ultimately canceled.

== Conception ==
After the cancelation of their tour, Sakanaction opted to perform an online concert in its place, as did many other artists amid pandemic restrictions. (Note: Other Japanese acts who performed online concerts around the time included Southern All-Stars, Tatsuro Yamashita, Shoko Nakagawa, Hitomi Yaida, Official Hige Dandism, Ulfuls, and Chihiro Onitsuka. Southern All-Stars's concert, livestreamed from the Yokohama Arena, achieved particular commercial success with over 500,000 live viewers.) However, in the description of Oricon's Yūichirō Fuse, the increase of online concerts had made it clear that they were insufficient replacements to in-person shows, which led several artists — including Sakanaction — to reconsider the unique possibilities of live performances tailored specifically for screens. Frontman Ichiro Yamaguchi's opinion was that online concerts would eventually reach a point where viewers would grow unenthusiastic and only watch them while wishing for a return to in-person performances; instead, he hoped the industry would begin to view online concerts as a new media genre. He said their goal was to invent a completely new kind of experience, but compared their approach of a "live music video" to Stop Making Sense (1984), a concert film by the American rock band Talking Heads. According to lead guitarist Motoharu Iwadera, they were uninterested in the typical online concert of simply performing as usual but without an in-person audience ("If we were going to do one, we might as well do something only possible [in an online concert]") and drummer Keiichi Ejima said they wanted to put a "spin" on it.

Art director Yusuke Tanaka, who had directed several music videos for the band, reprised his role as the general producer for the project, following his involvement in both of the previous 834.194 tours. (Note: The six music videos previously directed by Tanaka were "Bach no Senritsu o Yoru ni Kiita Sei Desu" (2011), "Yoru no Odoriko" (2012), "Sayonara wa Emotion" (2014), "Shin Takarajima" (2015), "Tabun, Kaze" (2016), and "Wasurerarenai no" (2019).) In an interview with Real Sound, Tanaka explained that the concert's basis was to create something alike a two-hour live music video and that the band wished to retain the general setlist and concept from the canceled tour, while creating something only possible through an online concert. He described planning the setlist as directing a music video for each song.

== Preparation and broadcast ==
Originally, Yamaguchi's wish was to perform the concert in September; however, he recalled that staff members expressed concern that pandemic restrictions might be loosened by then, which would allow for a standard concert to be held instead. Although that would not be the case, the project was as such hastened to August. To raise funds for their staff, the band organized a made-to-order box set containing their previous live video releases, which was opened to pre-orders in June 2020, (Note: The box set was shipped as Live Fish: Complete Box on October 14, 2020, and sold 15,000 copies.) and Santen Pharmaceutical — for whom Yamaguchi later became a brand ambassador — also sponsored the project. In 2024, Yamaguchi remembered the total budget as having been around ¥300 million (US$2.81 million).

To replicate the surround sound from Sakanaction's tours, the audio team used a 3D sound system developed by KLANG:Technologies (logo pictured). The first Japanese rock band to use the technology, Sakanaction advertised this fact around the concert's announcement.

The concert was filmed at the Chiba studio of Shimizu Octo, the set design company usually involved with the band's stage productions. The fact that the concert would only be viewed from a screen eliminated the need for a technical rehearsal and a run-through focused on the camerawork was held instead. This rehearsal was only attended by Yamaguchi, whilst the other band members gave real-time feedback by watching the video feed from their homes. Another rehearsal was held the day thereafter, attended by all members, in which they played the full set twice: the first as a soundcheck and the second as a dress rehearsal. The sound production for the concert was handled by audio engineers Sachio Sasaki and Masashi Uramoto, both regular members of Sakanaction's live staff, who tried to replicate the acoustic space of the Makuhari Messe. To try and reproduce the surround sound of Sakanaction's tours in a livestream, they utilized a 3D sound system developed by KLANG:Technologies, a German firm, which allowed them to place different instruments within a circular interface to render a three-dimensional mix. It was the first time the system was used in a Japanese livestreamed concert, and also the first usage by a Japanese rock band.

The online concert, titled Sakanaquarium Hikari Online, was announced on July 17, 2020, followed by a trailer uploaded to YouTube on August 1. Its usage of KLANG:Technologies' three-dimensional sound was announced on August 8, together with a Twitch livestream by Yamaguchi, in which he explained its functions. Two runs of the concert were held, livestreamed to Streaming+, Lawson Ticket Live Streaming, Pia Live Stream, and Line Live: the first show was on August 15, available only to fan club members, and the second was on August 16, accessible to all ticket holders. The concert was performed entirely live — camera cuts, on-screen captions (such as credits), and visual effects were all added in real-time. A team from the creative collective Rhizomatiks designed and operated the real-time visual effects during the songs "Wonderland" and "Music", and in the control room, Uramoto mastered the audio live by adding equalization and compression through the mixing console.

== Stage production and concert synopsis ==
=== Overview ===

The main stage of Hikari Online was constructed to move twenty meters backwards, from a smaller area with tighter lighting in the concert's opening half, to a space with a lighting setup similar to actual live venues in the latter. Pictured is Sakanaction performing in the first set (top) and the second (bottom).

Shows of Sakanaquarium Hikari Online ran for around two hours and featured a setlist of twenty songs, divided into two acts: the former more deep and mid-tempo, and the latter more upbeat. The band were clad in white and the staging included smoke, laser lights, various lightning techniques, and visual effects. The lack of an in-house audience allowed the production team more freedom in planning the lighting and lasers. For example, they were able to shine lasers more freely without fear that it would hit the crowd, and could shine light from in front of the band to cast shadows on stage, which would have been unfeasible in a regular concert since the audience would have been standing from the position of the light source.

Apart from a few ideas from Yamaguchi, Tanaka was given full creative control over the concert's production. (Note: Yamaguchi's two ideas were to start the concert from outside and to include a snack bar in the performance of "Kagerō".) Planning around the band's setlist, Tanaka wanted the former half of the concert to feature a more "visual" style in the lighting, with "objective" camera angles, and the latter half to be more reminiscent to typical live shows, with the cameras on lower elevation to emulate the eye level of an in-house audience member. The main stage was constructed on casters to make it capable of moving backwards approximately twenty meters, which would be done midway through the concert as a way to tangibly separate the two segments. Different sets were built at the front and back of the studio: the stage in its starting position was surrounded by three walls, creating an enclosed space, and featured a dense lighting setup; when the walls were removed and the stage backed up, it would reach a second set with a lighting system similar to actual live venues.

=== Synopsis ===
External video
- Sakanaquarium Hikari Online (songs 1–15); With live commentary by Yamaguchi
- "Sakanaction Yamaguchi Ichiro no Konya mo Zatsudan-chū. 2024.11.8" on YouTube

Sakanaquarium Hikari Online opened at the studio's outside roadway, where Yamaguchi stood alone and watched the concert livestream on his phone. Equipping his earpiece, he slowly walked to the studio as music was faintly heard in the background. When he opened the door to the inside, the intro to "Good-Bye" — which had conversely been the closer for the canceled tour — was already being performed. Yamaguchi joined his fellow band members, waiting inside, to finish the song within orange lighting. After this opening, described as already climactic by Natalie, colorful neon lighting was used consecutively for the next two songs: "Match to Peanuts" with pscyhedelic liquid light art, and "Kikitakatta Dance Music, Liquidroom ni" with lasers. The color coordination switched to a contrasting white for "Eureka", which was accompanied with projected monochrome footage of a cityscape. After these slower city pop and dance songs, the tempo rose towards the outro of "Eureka", which led into "Native Dancer". This velocity continued into "Wonderland", which was decorated with buggy visual effects.

The concert fell back into a slower pace and calmer orange lighting with "Ryūsen". The song led into "Chabashira", illuminated by a Japanese floor lamp, on which keyboardist Emi Okazaki played a simple piano accompaniment and bassist Ami Kusakari an upright bass using a bow. The following "Nylon no Ito" was backed with footage of a night sky, light rain fall, and a young woman. The concert reached its halfway point with "Boil". The performance of the song started off simple, but as Yamaguchi faced the camera in the final chorus, the walls surrounding the band were removed and smoke filled the screen. The stage was moved backwards to the second set as the concert entered its latter half.

After reaching the second set, Yamaguchi stepped off the stage and spoke to the audience; he mentioned the cancelation of the summer's rock festivals and asked viewers to have a good time, even if "just for today". He stepped away from the main stage to Snack Hikari, an elaborate recreation of a karaoke–snack bar in the corner of the studio, where he was joined by customers and the hostess in singing and dancing to "Kagerō". Yamaguchi returned to the main stage in time for the next song "Moth", which featured blaring lasers. It was followed with a series of upbeat tracks: the band were accompanied by traditionally-dressed dancers for "Yoru no Odoriko", followed by "Identity", where the live chat reached its peak according to Natalie, which then transitioned instantly into "Tabun, Kaze". "Rookie" then saw Iwadera and Kusakari fervently banging on snare drums.

For "Music", the band wore sunglasses and headphones, and performed the song from behind laptops, à la Kraftwerk. The performance was synchronized to Rhizomatik's visual effects, which included particles of light and a polygon school of fish. The band were joined by cheerleaders for "Shin Takarajima" — like in the song's music video — and confetti was fired on stage during "Wasurerarenai no". After Yamaguchi thanked the audience, they closed the show by performing "Sayonara wa Emotion" simultaneously to the end credits roll. The final shot showed the filming equipment and staff team from a behind-the-scenes angle of the studio.

== Critical reception ==
Several Japanese music publications praised Sakanaction's artistic exploration of the online concert as a medium. Tsuki no Hito for Real Sound considered Hikari Online to be the most meticulous livestreamed concert from around its period and praised the incorporation of "unprecedented" creative expressions. They described the concert as a "ground-breaking show with direction that creates presence and immersion almost unthinkable for an online [broadcast]", and continued: "Utilizing smoke, oil art, lasers, indirect lighting, large screens, and other elements, they add numerous surprises to the stage direction, strengthening the imagery of the songs to their greatest capacity and creating two hours of intellect and excitement". In a feature of the concert in Rockin'On Japan magazine, Hirokazu Koike described it as a "remarkable livestream, filled with ideas", that showed the band's efforts to deliver a new form of live entertainment. Hyōgo Shinji for DI:GA Online, in a round-up of online concerts from early August 2020, described Hikari Online as "terrific" and wrote that its visual artistry exceeded his expectations. He considered parts of its staging to be on par with music videos, and found that some parts resembled the quality of a video filmed in multiple takes and then polished in editing; the fact that the concert was undertaken live, he wrote, was "unbelievable".

According to Yūichirō Fuse, writing for Oricon, Sakanaction's "perfect" musical performance was what allowed their level of focus regarding the visual direction. Analyzing the concert's direction, he wrote that, by starting from the outside and performing within a studio — areas that could not be used in a typical live show — Hikari Online set itself apart from other remote concerts. "In livestreams, where the audience cannot be showered with loud music, be stimulated by dazzling lighting, or sweat while dancing", Fuse writes that the band prioritized visual expression to create a conceptual concert with focus on story. Fuse considered them successful in this regard, which he attributed to the collaboration of the stage and video production teams. Miho Takahashi, another reviewer for Rockin'On Japan, described the show as the "overwhelming single form of online concerts" and praised its incorporation of elements both unique to and unexpected for livestreamed music, namely high-budget cameras, KLANG:Technologies' sound system, and Rhizomatiks' visual effects. In a live report for Spice, Hideo Miyamoto found that Sakanaction successfully translated their identity into the online concert format and created an "unforgettable summer night".

== Aftermath ==
I'd like to thank everyone for watching show; we reached 60,000 viewers. [...] I asked the president of our agency if we were in the red — 'surely we made a profit?' He said, 'Yes, today's show was in the black. But we're still in the red with the canceled tour!' So he's still after me (laughs).

— Yamaguchi on Sakanaction's radio show, about the concert's financial performance

The August 16 show of Sakanaquarium Hikari Online, available to general ticket holders, was watched live by around 60,000. The day after the concert, on Sakanaction's radio program, Yamaguchi said that this commercial performance was enough to break a profit against the concert's budget, but that they were still in the red considering losses from the canceled tour. Archives of both livestreams remained available to ticket holders until August 23, 2020. While performing, the band and production team had been accompanied by a film crew from Nippon Television; the network's recording of the concert, compiled together with behind-the-scenes footage, interviews, and rehearsals, was aired to their Nittele Plus channel on October 31, 2020.

In November 2020, the band announced Sakanaquarium Kurayami, a six-show sound installation to be held at the Makuhari Messe in January 2021, but the event was canceled in December due to pandemic restrictions. (Note: The concerts, which had previously been performed in an earlier leg in 2019, would have consisted of songs played within complete darkness. In contrast to hikari (which translates to 'light'), kurayami is Japanese for 'darkness'.) The pandemic would become the inspiration for the band's two album project, Adapt (2022) and Apply (TBD), based on how artists adapt to — and then apply these methods within — the circumstances of the pandemic. Adapt was promoted with a second online concert, titled Sakanaquarium Adapt Online and performed on November 20–21, 2021. Tanaka reprised his role as director and constructed the stage around the Adapt Tower, a four-story object. The following 14-show tour for Adapt, which started in December 2021 and ended in January 2022, became the band's first in-person concerts in two years since the pandemic.

== Setlist ==
Setlist adapted from Rockin'On Japan

1. "Good-Bye"
2. "Match to Peanuts"
3. "Kikitakatta Dance Music, Liquidroom ni"
4. "Eureka"
5. "Native Dancer"
6. "Wonderland"
7. "Ryūsen"
8. "Chabashira"
9. "Nylon no Ito"
10. "Boil"
11. "Kagerō"
12. "Moth"
13. "Yoru no Odoriko"
14. "Identity"
15. "Tabun, Kaze"
16. "Rookie"
17. "Music"
18. "Shin Takarajima"
19. "Wasurerarenai no"
20. "Sayonara wa Emotion"

== Video album ==
Sakanaquarium Hikari Online

Video (live) by Sakanaction
- Released: March 17, 2021
- Recorded: August 16, 2020
- Length: 2:47:47
- Label: NF
- Director: Yusuke Tanaka

Sakanaction video chronology
Live Fish: Complete Box (2020)	Sakanaquarium Hikari Online (2021)	Sakanaquarium Adapt Online (2023)

Sakanaquarium Hikari Online, a Blu-ray and DVD video adaptation of the August 16 concert, was announced in November 2020, and was released by NF Records on March 17, 2021. The packaging design for the album was headed by Tanaka. Limited editions included a documentary to the concert featuring interviews with the band and staff, a booklet with behind-the-scenes content, and an audio recording of the concert on CD.

The video album sold 18,916 copies in its first week, (Note: 16,410 Blu-rays + 2,506 DVDs) and opened at numbers two and nine on Oricon's Blu-ray and DVD charts, respectively; for the music-only charts, it reached number one for Blu-rays and number five for DVDs. On February 28, 2024, the concert video was released to streaming on U-Next, alongside the band's other video albums.

=== Track listing ===
Track listing and lengths adapted from Tower Records Japan. All songs are written by Ichiro Yamaguchi and arranged by Sakanaction.

Sakanaquarium Hikari Online — Blu-ray/DVD
No.	Title	Length
1.	"Good-Bye"	5:23
2.	"Match to Peanuts"	4:32
3.	"Kikitakatta Dance Music, Liquidroom ni"	5:29
4.	"Eureka"	6:12
5.	"Native Dancer"	5:58
6.	"Wonderland"	6:00
7.	"Ryūsen"	6:33
8.	"Chabashira"	4:01
9.	"Nylon no Ito"	5:11
10.	"Boil"	3:50
11.	"Kagerō"	5:56
12.	"Moth"	4:16
13.	"Yoru no Odoriko"	5:02
14.	"Identity"	4:52
15.	"Tabun, Kaze"	5:57
16.	"Rookie"	6:45
17.	"Music"	6:01
18.	"Shin Takarajima"	5:30
19.	"Wasurerarenai no"	4:38
20.	"Sayonara wa Emotion"	4:30
Total length:		1:46:36

Sakanaquarium Hikari Online — Limited edition bonus documentary
No.	Title	Length
21.	"Documentary of Sakanaquarium Hikari Online"	1:01:11

Notes

- Fan club editions included an additional Blu-ray disc with the August 15 show.
- Limited and fan club editions also included a double CD album with audio recordings of the concert(s).
- "Documentary of Sakanaquarium Hikari Online" is located on a separate disc on the DVD release.

=== Charts ===
Weekly chart performance
Chart (2021)	Peak position
Japanese Blu-rays (Oricon)	2
Japanese Music Blu-rays (Oricon)	1
Japanese DVDs (Oricon)	9
Japanese Music DVDs (Oricon)	5

=== Release history ===
Release dates and formats
Region	Date	Edition	Format(s)	Label	Catalogue code(s)	Ref.
Japan	March 17, 2021	Regular	Blu-ray; DVD	NF Records	VIXL-327; VIBL-1008	
Japan	March 17, 2021	Limited	Blu-ray+2 CDs; 2 DVDs+2 CDs^{[a]}	NF Records	VIZL-1844; VIZL-1845	
Japan	March 17, 2021	Fan club	2 Blu-rays+2 CDs^{[b]}	NF Records	NZS-827	
Japan	February 28, 2024	—N/a	Video streaming (U-Next exclusive)	—N/a	—N/a	

a. Limited editions also included a data booklet.
b. Fan club editions also included a data booklet, three face masks, and a towel.
