= Yusuke Tanaka (director) =

Japanese videographer

- 田中 裕介
- Born: 1978 (age 47–48)
- Education: Tama Art University
- Occupation: Director
- Organization: Caviar
- Website: usk.tokyo

Yusuke Tanaka (田中 裕介, Tanaka Yūsuke; born 1978) is a Japanese film director best known for music videos and television commercials. He has directed videos for the artists Perfume, Sakanaction, and Namie Amuro, among others.

== Filmography ==
=== Music videos ===
Year	Title	Artist	Ref.
2005	"Iruka" (co-directed with Takeshi Nakamura)	Soul'd Out	
2006	"Yakan Hikou"	Apogee	
2006	"Boyfriend"	Ayuse Kozue	
2006	"Ghost Song"	Apogee	
2006	"Bye My Melody"	Ken Hirai	
2006	"Good-Bye"	Apogee	
2007	"Eyes to Eyes"	Ayuse Kozue	
2007	"When I Wish Upon a Star"	Ayuse Kozue	
2007	"Fuwafuwa"	369	
2008	"Rock Steady"	Namie Amuro	
2008	"Sandae Love"	Ayuse Kozue	
2008	"Do Me More"	Namie Amuro	
2008	"A Man from the New Town"	Your Song Is Good	
2009	"1, 2, 3"	Apogee	
2009	"Candy"	Ken Hirai	
2009	"Dancing on the Fire"	Superfly	
2009	"Defend Love"	Namie Amuro	
2010	"Boku kara Kimi e"	Galileo Galilei	
2011	"Jack Goes On"	Rip Slyme	
2011	"Bach no Senritsu o Yoru ni Kiita Sei Desu"	Sakanaction	
2012	"Spring of Life"	Perfume	
2012	"Wordy"	Towa Tei with Bakubaku Dokin	
2012	"Spending All My Time"	Perfume	
2013	"Mirai no Museum"	Perfume	
2013	"Yoru no Odoriko"	Sakanaction	
2013	"Sweet Refrain"	Perfume	
2014	"Sayonara wa Emotion"	Sakanaction	
2015	"Crazy Party Night (Pumpkin no Gyakushū)"	Kyary Pamyu Pamyu	
2015	"Shin Takarajima"	Sakanaction	
2016	"Flash"	Perfume	
2016	"Tabun, Kaze"	Sakanaction	
2017	"N.E.O."	Chai	
2017	"Obsession" (co-directed with Damian Kulash)	OK Go	
2019	"Wasurerarenai no"	Sakanaction	
2020	"Kaibutsusan"	Ken Hirai featuring Aimyon	
2020	"Time Warp"	Perfume	
2021	"Polygon Wave"	Perfume	
2022	"Spinning World"	Perfume	
2024	"Blow Your Cover"	Number_i	
2024	"Mainichi"	Kenshi Yonezu	
2024	"Cosmic Treat"	Perfume	
2025	"Kaijū"	Sakanaction	
2025	"Meguru Loop"	Perfume	
2026	"Iranai"	Sakanaction	

== Awards and nominations ==
Award	Year	Category	Recipient	Result	Ref.
MTV Video Music Awards Japan	2019	Best Dance Video	"Wasurerarenai no" (Sakanaction)	Won	
Music Awards Japan	2026	Best Music Video	"Kaijū" (Sakanaction)	Won	
Space Shower Music Video Awards	2007	Best Director	Yusuke Tanaka	Won	
Space Shower Music Video Awards	2009	Best Alternative Video	"A Man from the New Town" (Your Song Is Good)	Won	
Space Shower Music Video Awards	2012	Best Video of the Year	"Bach no Senritsu o Yoru ni Kiita Sei Desu" (Sakanaction)	Won	
