= Hasu no Hana =

- "Hasu no Hana (Movie Version)" cover.

Single by Sakanaction

from the album 834.194
- Released: October 8, 2014
- Recorded: 2014
- Genre: Psychedelic pop, dub, funk
- Length: 4:43 (movie version); 4:45 (single version)
- Label: Victor Entertainment
- Songwriter: Ichiro Yamaguchi
- Producer: Sakanaction

Sakanaction singles chronology
"Eureka" (2014)	"Hasu no Hana" (2014)	"Sayonara wa Emotion" (2014)

Alternative cover
- "Sayonara wa Emotion" / "Hasu no Hana" single cover.

"Hasu no Hana" (Japanese: 蓮の花; "Lotus Flower") (Japanese pronunciation: [hasɯnohana]) is a song by Japanese band Sakanaction from their seventh studio album, 834.194 (2019). The song was used as the theme song of the film Close Range Love (2014) starring Tomohisa Yamashita and Nana Komatsu. The version used in the film was given an initial release on October 8, 2014 digitally, followed by a single release featuring a different mix of the song on October 29, where it was paired with the song "Sayonara wa Emotion" as a double A-side single.

== Background and development ==
In March 2013, Sakanaction released their sixth studio album Sakanaction. The album was a result of the band's vocalist and songwriter Ichiro Yamaguchi feeling a new resolution to create music that would resonate with a general pop music audience, and featured several songs with high-profile commercial tie-ups. The first of these was the band's single "Boku to Hana", released in May 2012, which was used as the theme song for the Tsuyoshi Kusanagi drama 37-sai de Isha ni Natta Boku: Kenshui Junjō Monogatari, Three months later, the band followed this with the single "Yoru no Odoriko", a song that had been featured in commercials for the design school Mode Gakuen from April 2013. A month and a half before the album's release, the band released the single "Music", a song used as the theme song for the Yōsuke Eguchi-starring Fuji Television drama Dinner. The album debuted at number one on Oricon's weekly albums chart, after selling 83,000 copies. This was a record for the band, both in terms of the number of copies that they had sold in one week of a release, as well as the fact that they had never reached number one on an Oricon chart before. The release is currently the band's most successful album, in terms of physical copies sold.

After the release of Sakanaction, Yamaguchi wanted to take an extended break, however because of the strongly positive response that the band had for the album, he felt that he needed to keep on releasing music. Soon after the band finished touring, Yamaguchi worked on a jingle for the yobikō Tōshin High School, a song that would grow to become "Sayonara wa Emotion". Yamaguchi felt exhausted from the tour and was only able to develop the song's chorus. While Yamaguchi was working on "Sayonara wa Emotion", he was contacted to write a song for the film Judge!, which became the song "Eureka".

Originally, Yamaguchi intended for "Sayonara wa Emotion" and "Eureka" to be released as a double A-side single, however suffered writer's block and exhaustion, and could not finish "Sayonara wa Emotion". In its place, the band recorded "Good-Bye", an improvised composition that used musical techniques that he personally wanted to explore. "Good-Bye" / "Eureka" was released in January 2014, and reached number two on Oricon's weekly singles chart. Immediately after the single's release, the band embarked on their Sakanaquarium 2014 Sakanatribe tour, a 22 date Japanese tour featuring performances at Zepp live houses and two dates at the Tokyo Dome City Hall, between January and March 2014. Footage from one of their performances at the Tokyo Dome City Hall was released as a video album on July 30.

Production on "Hasu no Hana" began in mid-March, when the band were finishing their Sakanatribe tour. Though the band had recorded their previous album Sakanaction at Yamaguchi's apartment, only the pre-production for "Hasu no Hana" was undertaken there. Instead, the band recorded the song in a recording studio. "Hasu no Hana" was announced as the theme song for the film Close Range Love, as well as its spin-off drama, Kin Kyori Renai: Season Zero, which began airing on Nippon Television on July 19. The song's release as a part of the "Sayonara wa Emotion" / "Hasu no Hana" was announced on September 12, when the band were still recording the single version of the song. The band finally finished both versions on September 28, a month before the physical single's release.

== Writing and inspiration ==
=== Creation ===
"Hasu no Hana" was created as the producers of Close Range Love had specifically commissioned a song for their film. This was the second time Sakanaction had been asked to create a film theme song, after "Eureka", the ending theme song of Judge! (2014). The band found creating songs for commercial tie-ups a difficult balancing act, as they wanted to release music that the band personally wanted to create, however it needed to be something that would match the commercial endeavor, or else this would reflect the band poorly. Yamaguchi began the writing process by watching Close Range Love without the soundtrack, and considered the perspective of fans of the film's lead actor Tomohisa Yamashita, wondering why he was not asked to create the theme song. He reasoned that the film's creators wanted to elevate the film's status from being merely a star vehicle, and felt that the band's role was to create something that would be well-received critically.

Yamaguchi saw Close Range Love as a classic-style love film, and wrote the song while considering the film's younger audience, who had no previous listening experience of the band. The first draft of the song followed the film's themes closely, which Yamaguchi found too simplistic, and made him unsure how to properly write a song for a romance film. The band decided to create a song without thinking of its use in the film, instead making a composition that felt natural in terms of their own musical style, and hoped the result would naturally match the film. Yamaguchi found that this technique worked well for the melody, however he found that writing lyrics entirely independent of the song was too difficult. Over time, he grew to be bored of the song's melody, and decided to change it during the late stages of creating the song. After doing this, he found the song's lyrics came easily to him.

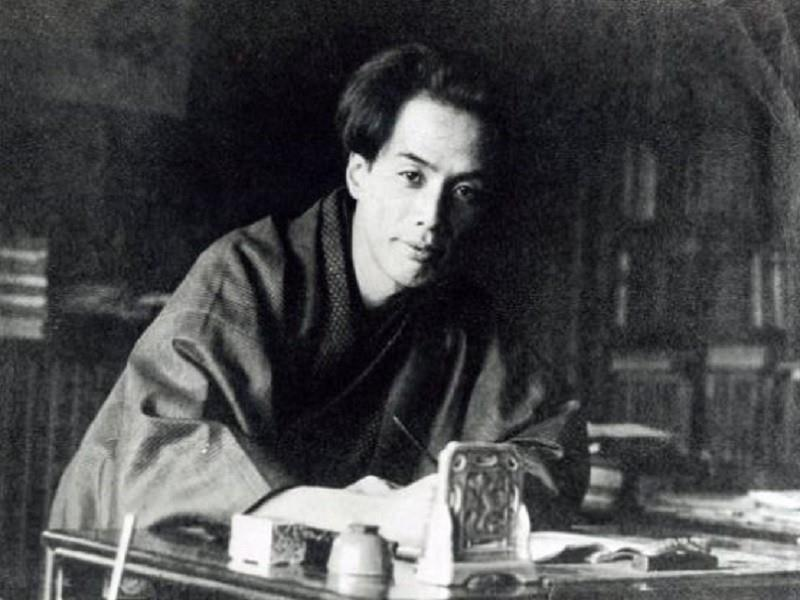
The song's lyrics were written as a modern imagining of Ryūnosuke Akutagawa's short story The Spider's Thread (1918).

The song's lyrics are a description of a real scene in Yamaguchi's apartment, while he was frustrated about lyrical writer's block. Yamaguchi created the lyrical motif of spiders in the song, as at that time of the year there were many spiders in his Tokyo apartment. He linked the spiders to Japanese author Ryūnosuke Akutagawa's short story The Spider's Thread (1918), and developed the song as a modern envisioning of the story. Yamaguchi does not believe that the song directly links to the film's contents or fit its image, however felt that a natural link was made, simply because of how it was contextually linked to the film by playing during the credits.

The band emphasized the "groove" of the song, and found it important that every musical aspect of the song was blended together. They found that this was difficult to balance, and recorded the song while simultaneously using computers and instruments while a Korg Donca Matic rhythm machine kept time. They found that recording with this method meant the music was more sensitive to maintaining the song's groove. Due to the film's young female audience, an early idea by the band was to have bassist Ami Kusakari sing the song, which she did in initial demo takes. Sakanaction decided against this, because they were concerned that the film's production staff would feel misled, having commissioned a Sakanaction song and assuming that Yamaguchi would be the one singing it.

=== Film and single versions ===
Two versions of the song were made by the band, first the film version, followed by version found on the "Sayonara wa Emotion" / "Hasu no Hana" single. Sakanaction created the single version because of how Yamaguchi's late stage change to the song's melody and lyrics. As the film version's backing track was intended for a song with a different melody, the band decided to release a second version that corrected for this. They wanted the film and single versions to be packaged separately, to emphasize the difference between the two. The film version featured scratching, and was intended to be a hip-hop inspired melody. The single version was mostly re-recorded, however keeping the song's melody and lyrics the same (except for the word mōsō (妄想; "delusion") which was re-recorded as sōzō (想像; "imagination")). The film version's synth drums were re-recorded with a live drum set, and the single version was created to consciously have more of a "human groove" then the original. The band jokingly referred to the single version as "Japanese Buddhist psychedelic pop", due to the song's stronger live band and electropunk sound.

Yamaguchi stated that the band were likely to re-record "Hasu no Hana" again for a future album, and would continue to experiment with the song's sound.

== Composition ==
"Hasu no Hana" (single version)
Tomoyuki Mori praised the song's relaxed tempo, and believed the skills of each member were exemplified in the composition.

"Hasu no Hana" is a medium tempo pop song, with elements of dub, psychedelic and funk. The film version strongly featured synthesizers and a rhythm machine, while the single version was re-recorded with a "rock band" sound with live instruments as its basis.

== Promotion and release ==
The film version of "Hasu no Hana" was unveiled in the first episode of the spin-off drama Kin Kyori Renai: Season Zero, which debuted on Nippon Television on July 19. The single version of "Hasu no Hana" was debuted on Japanese radio on October 7 by Yamaguchi, who played the song on his Tokyo FM School of Lock! radio show, Sakanalocks!. The next day, the film version of the song was released exclusively as a digital download, a day before the film's roadshow release at Japanese cinemas. In mid-October, the band opened a special website relating to the single, featuring interviews with the single's production staff.

When recording "Hasu no Hana", the band decided that the mid-tempo pop song would pair well with "Sayonara wa Emotion", a "raw and emotional" song, so decided to release these together as a double A-side single on October 29. "Sayonara wa Emotion" / "Hasu no Hana" was the band's 10th physical single release, so to commemorate this, made the release a deluxe CD/DVD package, featuring an EP-like single length and over 50 minutes of DVD footage. The single featured two B-sides, the first of which was a remix of the version of "Ame(B) that Sakanaction performed on their Sakanaquarium Sakanatribe tour, given a stronger club sound by musician Aoki Takamasa. Yamaguchi asked Aoki to create this different mix of the song, as he felt that he had overworked the song. The second B-side was a remix of the band's 2013 single "Music" in an acoustic style by Japanese musician Cornelius. The single's DVD featured two studio live performances that had originally been broadcast on their Ustream channel: "Good-Bye" featuring Tamaki Roy and "Sample", rearranged by Sachio "Sunny" Sasaki, including interviews with both Tamaki and Sasaki. The physical single's cover and booklet were created by Hatos. He attempted to create cover artwork that would make a world view that bridged both songs. The booklet was printed with heat-sensitive ink, so that the "Hasu no Hana" lyrics were only visible when exposed to heat.

During the single's promotions, the band performed at English DJ Fatboy Slim's Japan concert on October 19, and performed at the Japan Night in TIMM music event, held at Zepp Divercity Tokyo on October 23. The band performed "Hasu no Hana" for the first time on the Japanese television, on the music program Live Monster on October 27, 2014.

== Music video ==
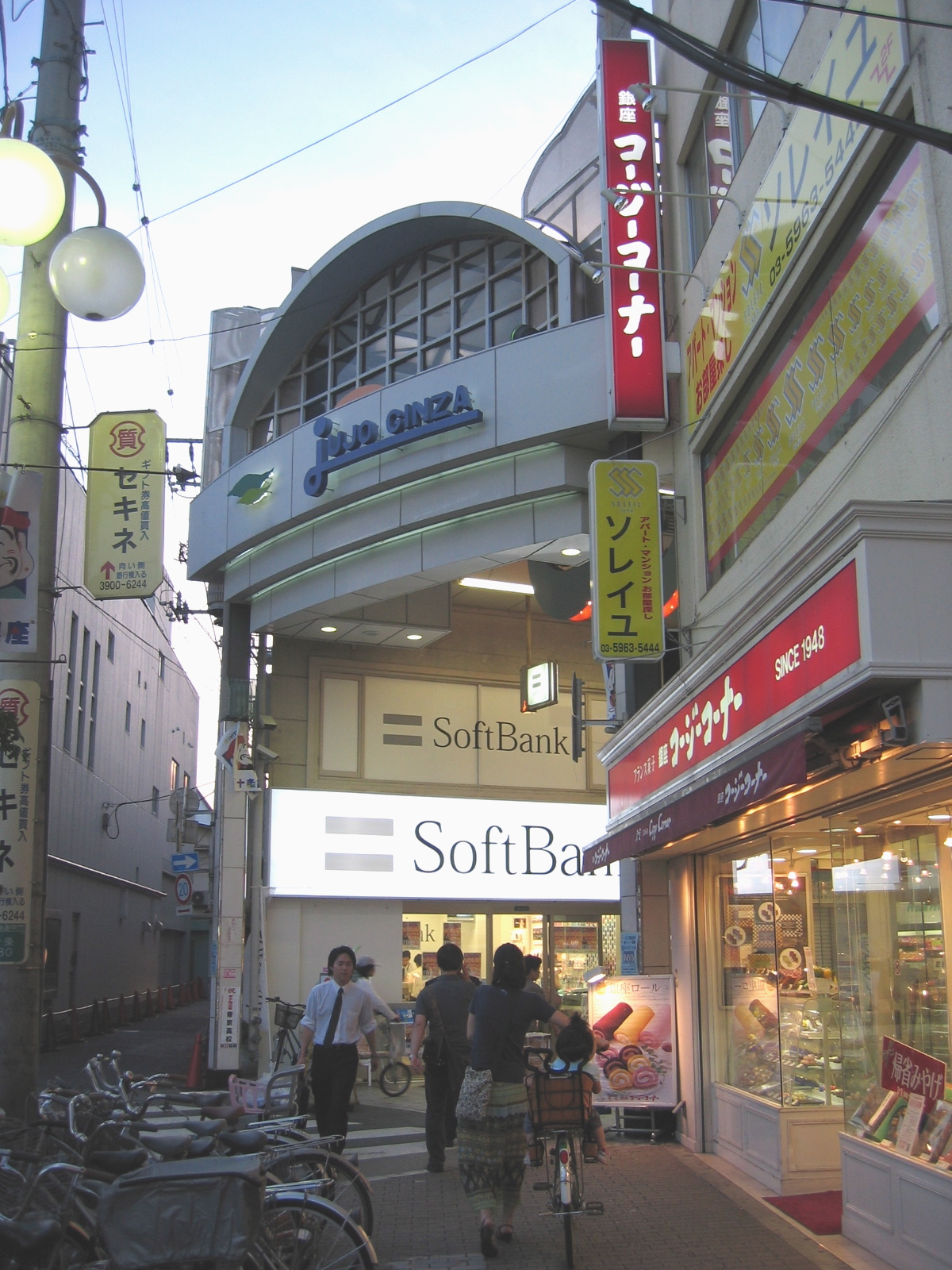
Several scenes of the music video were night-time shots of the Jūjō Ginza Shopping Arcade (pictured).

The music video for "Hasu no Hana" was directed by Yasuyuki Yamaguchi, and was unveiled on YouTube on November 12, two weeks after the single's physical release date as the band were not able to complete the video in time for the single. Sakanaction had worked with Yasuyuki Yamaguchi several times before, on videos for songs such as "Document" (2011), "Boku to Hana" (2012) and "Eureka" (2014). The video was shot in several locations around Tokyo, including the Benny Super supermarket in Sano, Adachi, Tokyo, Jūjō Ginza Shopping Arcade and the café Kissa Ginza in Ebisu. The video depicts Ichiro Yamaguchi performing everyday tasks such as driving and visiting a supermarket, while accompanied by a man in a spider costume. The final scenes depict Yamaguchi and the spider costume man dancing at night time along a closed shopping arcade, while intensely smiling.

For "Hasu no Hana"'s music video, Yasuyuki Yamaguchi only worked together with Ichiro Yamaguchi, instead of the entire band. Yasuyuki Yamaguchi wanted to do something different to his previous videos for the band: the story-focused "Document", the dramatic play in "Boku to Hana" and the art-focused "Eureka". After listening to the song, he was first inspired with an image of kaibutsu, and proposed an elaborate story for the video, depicting a society where kaibutsu lived oppressed lives, and a final scene where a lotus plant would flower. Though the idea in its entirety was not used, the idea of the spider costume man grew from the kaibutsu theme. Yasuyuki Yamaguchi wanted to express the everyday world inside a person's mind, which included realizations of fantastic things, such as the spider costume man. Yasuyuki Yamaguchi and Ichiro Yamaguchi continued to pitch ideas while they were filming the music video, changing the video from its original plan even further. Of the three main locations the crew shot at, one was almost entirely removed (the café is only shown momentarily), and some shots in the final cut of the video were out-takes.

== Reception ==
=== Critical reception ===
Tomoyuki Mori of What's In? felt that the song's relaxed tempo was able to strongly affect listeners, and that each member of Sakanaction's skills as musicians were shown off in the song.

=== Commercial reception ===
"Hasu no Hana" received minor airplay after its radio debut and its digital release in the second week of October, however was the fifth post played song on Japanese radio the next week. This preceded "Sayonara wa Emotion"'s wide-scale airplay in Japan by two weeks. Radio play continued to be strong in Japan until the week after the single's physical release, when it suddenly dropped out of the top ten played songs to become the ninetieth.

During its initial release as a digital single, "Hasu no Hana" was the ninth most purchased song in Japan (combining physical and digital sales), meaning that it debuted at number 12 on the Billboard Japan Hot 100 chart. Sales steadily dropped until the release of the single's physical single three weeks later, when it re-entered the top 40 most sold songs. Compared to "Sayonara wa Emotion", "Hasu no Hana" received lower charting positions, however charted higher for more weeks than its counterpart.

In its first week, the "Sayonara wa Emotion" / "Hasu no Hana" single reached number four on the Oricon single charts. Both Oricon and SoundScan Japan independently tracked an estimated 21,000 physical copies sold in the single's first week. The single dropped to number 24 in its second week, and only spent these two weeks in the top 30 singles. The release spent a total of six weeks on the top 200 singles chart, selling a total of 27,000 physical copies in this time.

== Track listings ==
All tracks are written by Ichiro Yamaguchi.

Digital download
No.	Title	Length
1.	"Hasu no Hana (Movie Version)"	4:43
Total length:		4:43

All tracks are written by Ichiro Yamaguchi.

Physical single, digital EP
No.	Title	Length
1.	"Sayonara wa Emotion" (さよならはエモーション, "Goodbyes Are Emotion")	4:22
2.	"Hasu no Hana (Single Version)" (蓮の花, "Lotus Flower")	4:45
3.	"Ame(B) (Sakanatribe × ATM Version)"	8:13
4.	"Music (Cornelius Remix)" (ミュージック Myūjikku)	5:44
Total length:		23:04

DVD
No.	Title	Length
1.	"Good-Bye Session featuring Tamaki Roy: Broadcasted on Ustream on 2013.11.28"	14:29
2.	"Ichiro Yamaguchi x Tamaki Roy Talk Session"	10:48
3.	"Sample Studio Live Guest Sachio "Sunny" Sasaki: Broadcasted on Ustream on 2014.8.5"	24:24
4.	"Sachio "Sunny" Sasaki Interview"	8:19
Total length:		58:00

== Personnel ==
Personnel details were sourced from "Sayonara wa Emotion" / "Hasu no Hana"'s liner notes booklet. Music video personnel information was sourced from Sakanction's official YouTube channel.

Sakanaction

- All members – arrangement, production
- Keiichi Ejima – drums
- Motoharu Iwadera – guitar
- Ami Kusakari – bass guitar
- Emi Okazaki – keyboards
- Ichiro Yamaguchi – vocals, guitar, lyrics, composition

Music video

- Mei Hashimoto – production manager
- Tatsuya Hirai – lighting
- Taiga Ishino – costume creator
- Ayako Kakehi – cast member
- Asami Nemoto – hair, make-up
- Hideyuki Nomura – producer
- Ayano Tanaka – cast member
- Q-Taro – dancer
- Ayane Tsukiyono – cast member
- Emiki Sato – production manager
- Emi Tsuruno – production manager
- Mina Yamagushi – cast member
- Yasuyuki Yamaguchi – director, cameraman
- Tomohiro Yamashita – camera assistant
- Tokyo No. 1 – production company

== Chart rankings ==
Chart (2014)	Peak position
Japan Billboard Adult Contemporary Airplay	7
Japan Billboard Japan Hot 100	12
Japan Oricon weekly singles: "Sayonara wa Emotion" / "Hasu no Hana"	4

=== Sales ===
Chart	Amount
Oricon physical sales: "Sayonara wa Emotion" / "Hasu no Hana"	27,000

== Release history ==
Region	Date	Format	Distributing Label	Catalog codes
Japan	October 7, 2014	Radio add date	Victor Entertainment	—N/a
Japan	October 8, 2014	digital download ("Movie Version")	Victor Entertainment	VE3WA-17269
Japan	October 29, 2014	CD single, CD/DVD single, digital EP	Victor Entertainment	VICL-36963, VIZL-721
Japan	November 15, 2014	rental CD	Victor Entertainment	VICL-36963
