= Eureka (Sakanaction song) =

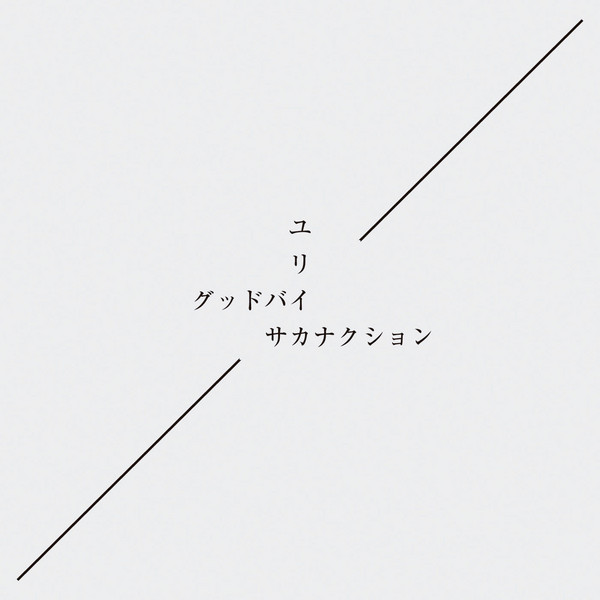
- CD/DVD and digital download editions' cover of "Good-Bye" / "Eureka".

Single by Sakanaction

from the album 834.194
- Released: January 15, 2014
- Recorded: 2013
- Genre: Minimal techno, city pop
- Length: 5:33
- Label: Victor Entertainment
- Songwriter: Ichiro Yamaguchi
- Producer: Sakanaction

Sakanaction singles chronology
"Good-Bye" (2013)	"Eureka" (2014)	"Hasu no Hana" (2014)

"Eureka" (Japanese: ユリイカ, Hepburn: Yurīka; IPA: [jɯɾiꜜːka]) is a song by Japanese band Sakanaction from their seventh studio album, 834.194 (2019). It was released as a single in January 2014, as a double A-side single with the song "Good-Bye". The minimal techno and city pop song served as the ending credits theme song of the film Judge! (2014), while their 2010 single "Identity" was used as the film's theme song. The song was composed while the band's vocalist and songwriter Ichiro Yamaguchi was physically and mentally unwell. He used his feelings of homesickness during this time to write lyrics that compared his current residence, Tokyo, to his hometown of Otaru, Hokkaido.

The physical single debuted at number two on Oricon's weekly singles chart, while "Eureka" reached number four on the Billboard Japan Hot 100, less successful than "Good-Bye" which reached number two. Critics praised the song's "addictive" electro and minimalist sound, and felt that it was reminiscent of the works of Rei Harakami.

== Background and development ==
In March 2013, Sakanaction released their sixth studio album Sakanaction. The album was a result of the band's vocalist and songwriter Ichiro Yamaguchi felt a new resolution to create music that would resonate with a general pop music audience, and featured several songs with high-profile commercial tie-ups. The first of these was the band's single "Boku to Hana", released in May 2012, which was used as the theme song for the Tsuyoshi Kusanagi drama 37-sai de Isha ni Natta Boku: Kenshui Junjō Monogatari, Three months later, the band followed this with the single "Yoru no Odoriko", a song that had been featured in commercials for the design school Mode Gakuen from April 2013. A month and a half before the album's release, the band released the single "Music", a song used as the theme song for the Yōsuke Eguchi-starring Fuji Television drama Dinner. Another song found on the album, "Aoi", was commissioned by the Japanese national broadcaster NHK for a theme song for them to use for their 2013 broadcast of soccer events. The band wanted to balance these songs created for a wide audience with songs that they personally wanted to create, so gave the album a Möbius strip theme to illustrate this. The album debuted at number one on Oricon's weekly albums chart, after selling 83,000 copies. This was a record for the band, both in terms of the number of copies that they had sold in one week of a release, as well as the fact that they had never reached number one on an Oricon chart before. The release is currently the band's most successful album, in terms of physical copies sold.

From March to June, the band performed a tour to promote the album, Sakanaquarium 2013. This tour included 19 performances, including two dates at the Makuhari Messe hall, and their first solo-billed overseas performance in Taipei, Taiwan. The band were invited to the 64th Kōhaku Uta Gassen, NHK's annual New Year's music contest, where they performed the album's final single "Music". The band had set themselves a goal to perform two dates at Makuhari Messe, after achieving their goal of performing there once for their previous album, Documentaly (2011). Though the two concerts and their appearance at the Kōhaku Uta Gassen were milestones for the band, the members of Sakanaction did not personally feel that these were achievements, and left Yamaguchi feeling that he wanted to leave a greater impression on the world of music.

After the release of Sakanaction, Yamaguchi wanted to take an extended break, however because of the strongly positive response that the band had for the album, he felt that he needed to keep on releasing music. Soon after the band finished touring, Yamaguchi worked on a jingle for the yobikō Tōshin High School, a song that would grow to become "Sayonara wa Emotion". Yamaguchi felt exhausted from the tour and was only able to develop the song's chorus.

While Yamaguchi was working on "Sayonara wa Emotion", he was contacted to write a song for the film Judge!, which he accepted. Originally the film staff had asked Sakanaction if they could use their 2010 single "Identity" for the theme song, which Yamaguchi thought of as a great honor as a composer. Afterwards, the staff asked Yamaguchi to create an additional song to play during the ending credits, which led him to create "Eureka". He shelved "Sayonara wa Emotion" to focus on writing "Eureka", and intended to release "Sayonara wa Emotion" and "Eureka" together as a double A-side single.

== Writing and inspiration ==
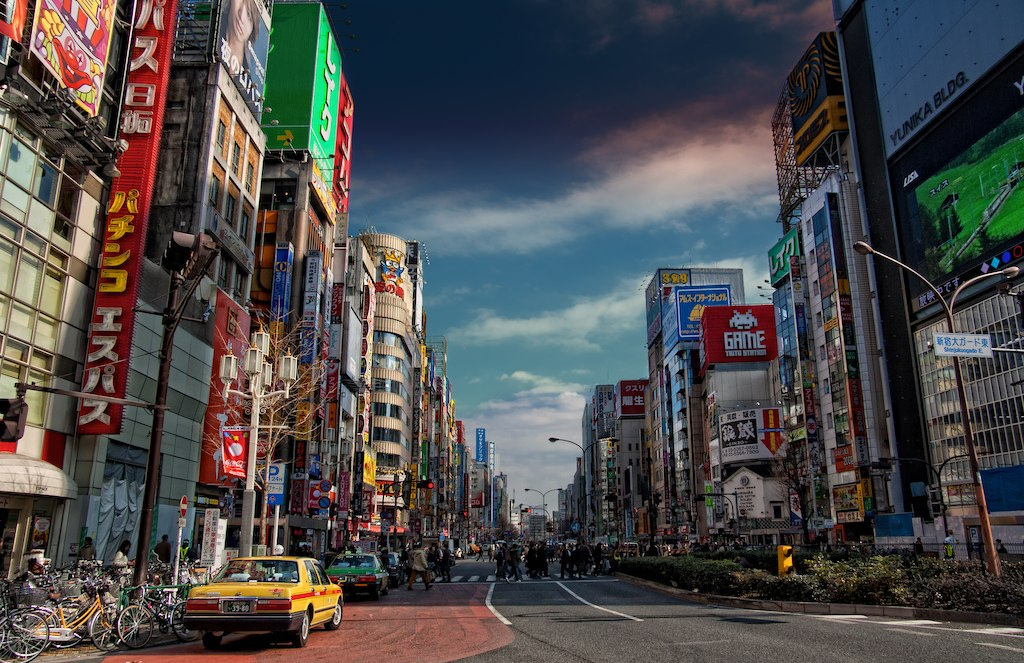
"Eureka" was inspired by the city of Tokyo.

While he wrote "Eureka", Yamaguchi became sick both physically and mentally, developing hives and becoming disillusioned with the idea of writing music for other entities. The song was inspired by Yamaguchi's feelings of becoming too accustomed to making songs for others. Yamaguchi's poor mental state affected the song while he was writing it. He wrote the song's lyrics over the course of one night in Adobe Illustrator, while he sat with the curtains shut in front of his computer in his apartment, but spent much of the time revising the song. The lyrics mention Houttuynia cordata tea (ドクダミ茶, dokudami-cha), a tea meant to detoxify the body according to Japanese folk medicine, because that was what he had been drinking during that night to aid himself.

Thematically, Yamaguchi wrote the lyrics about the city of Tokyo, and how he saw it as a city primarily made up of people who have moved there from somewhere else. The lyrics compared Tokyo to his home town of Otaru, Hokkaido, and expressed his homesickness. "Eureka" thematically linked to the other leading song on the single, "Good-Bye", which was written about Yamaguchi's decision to continue to make music in Tokyo.

== Composition ==
"Eureka"
Critics praised "Eureka"'s electro and minimalist sound, as well as its balance between live instruments and electronic sounds.

"Eureka" is a "new city pop"-style song with a minimal techno basis.

== Promotion and release ==
On November 14, 2013, it was revealed that Sakanaction's song "Identity" would be used as the theme song of the film Judge!, while a new song "Eureka" would be the film's ending credits theme. A week and a half later, it was announced that "Eureka" would be released as a double A-side single with "Good-Bye". On January 11, 2014, the film was released in cinemas in Japan. On January 15, two physical editions of the "Good-Bye" / "Eureka" single were released: a CD-only edition and a CD/DVD edition. Both editions featured a remix of the song "Eiga" from Sakanaction created by electronic musician Aoki Takamasa. The DVD featured the music video for "Eureka", plus a behind-the-scenes documentary of the recording for their live tour video album Sakanaquarium 2013 Sakanaction: Live at Makuhari Messe.

On January 18, the band embarked on their Sakanaquarium 2014 Sakanatribe tour, a 22 date Japanese tour featuring performances at Zepp live houses and two dates at the Tokyo Dome City Hall, between January and March 2014. Footage from the tour final at Tokyo Dome City Hall on March 16 was released as a video album Sakanatribe 2014: Live at Tokyo Dome City Hall, which featured a performance of "Eureka".

The band's August 2015 compilation album Natsukashii Tsuki wa Atarashii Tsuki: Coupling & Remix Works featured a minimalist demo of the song. "Eureka (Minimal Demo)" was not present on the album's CD material, however was a part of Tsuki no Keshiki, the album's visual media disc, where it was featured against the otherwise unaltered music video for "Eureka".

== Music video ==
The music video was directed by Yasuyuki Yamaguchi, who had worked with the band previously for the videos for "Document" (2011), "Boku to Hana" (2012) and "Inori (Extended Mix)" (2013). Yasuyuki attempted to create an avant-garde video that expressed the song's homesickness and artistic nature. The video had already been filmed by early December, and it was unveiled on YouTube on December 28, 2013.

The video depicts Yamaguchi in a darkened room, behind a row of naked women who are lying down on the ground in a line. He traces the contours that their bodies made, as he walks past the bodies. These scenes are interspersed with footage of Tokyo. In the final scene, a wider top-down angle shows that the naked women are spelling out the word eureka in capital letters.

== Reception ==
=== Critical reception ===
Critical reviews of the song were positive in Japan. Billboard Japan reviewer Takushi Yamaguchi called "Eureka" a "high quality song", feeling that it was an extension of the techno pop material found on the band's previous album, Sakanaction. He praised the structure of the song, and its ability to draw him back into it, even after it had finished playing. CDJournal reviewers felt "Eureka"'s electro and minimalist sound was "addictive" and reminiscent of Rei Harakami. Tomoyuki Mori of What's In? believed that "Eureka" was proof of Sakanaction's skill at being a ground-breaking electronic musical group, describing the "minimal techno" song as "a miraculous balance of a subtly constructed track and a raw band sound." Mori further praised the song's lyrics' contrast of a hometown and Tokyo as leaving a strong impression.

Dai Onojima of Rockin' On Japan noted that both "Good-Bye" and "Eureka" had definite pop song structures, as opposed to songs that focused on an "instrumental groove" such as on their previous album, Sakanaction.

=== Commercial reception ===
Both "Good-Bye" and "Eureka" debuted on the Billboard Adult Contemporary Airplay chart on the same week in early January, with "Eureka" out-performing "Good-Bye" to be the second most played song on adult contemporary radio stations, while "Good-Bye" was only the fifteenth most played song. During this week, "Good-Bye" was exclusively played on adult contemporary radio stations, as it did not enter the top 100 for Billboard's general radio chart, despite "Eureka" being the second most played song. In the next week, "Good-Bye" had overtaken "Eureka" in terms of radio airplay. Over the songs' charting course, "Good-Bye" saw consistently stronger sales and radio airplay. Five weeks after first charting, "Good-Bye" and "Eureka" were no longer noticeably selling or receiving airplay.

As a physical single, "Good-Bye" / "Eureka" reached number two on Oricon's weekly singles chart, underneath boyband Kanjani Eight's single "Hibiki". Oricon tracked 22,000 physical copies being sold in its first week, with a two-week total of 27,000, while the sales tracking agency SoundScan Japan tracked 21,000 copies in the single's first week, with a total of 25,000 copies tracked over two weeks. The single quickly fell out of the top twenty, charting in the top 100 singles for five weeks, and the top 200 singles for eight weeks.

== Track listing ==
All tracks are written by Ichiro Yamaguchi.

Physical single, digital EP
No.	Title	Length
1.	"Good-Bye" (グッドバイ Guddobai)	4:41
2.	"Eureka"	5:33
3.	"Eiga (Aoki Takamasa Remix)" (映画, "Film")	5:02
Total length:		15:16

DVD
No.	Title	Length
1.	"Eureka (Music Video)"
2.	"Behind the Scenes of Sakanaquarium 2013 Sakanaction: Live at Makuhari Messe"

== Personnel ==
Personnel details were sourced from "Good-Bye" / "Eureka"'s liner notes booklet. Music video personnel information was sourced from Sakanction's official YouTube channel.

Sakanaction

- All members – arrangement, production
- Keiichi Ejima – drums
- Motoharu Iwadera – guitar
- Ami Kusakari – bass guitar
- Emi Okazaki – keyboards
- Ichiro Yamaguchi – vocals, guitar, lyrics, composition

Music video

- Kojiro Kobayashi – casting
- Tsuyoshi Koiwa – lighting
- Ko Nakamura – camera
- Rika Nakamura – assistant producer
- Asami Nemoto – hair, make-up
- Hideyuki Nomura – producer, camera
- Masatoshi Takizawa – camera
- Nozomi Tanaka – camera
- Yasuyuki Yamaguchi – director, camera, editing
- Yuya Yokokura – assistant director

== Chart rankings ==
Chart (2014)	Peak position
Japan Billboard Adult Contemporary Airplay	2
Japan Billboard Japan Hot 100	4
Japan Oricon weekly singles: "Good-Bye" / "Eureka"	2

=== Sales ===
Chart	Amount
Oricon physical sales: "Good-Bye" / "Eureka"	32,000

== Release history ==
Region	Date	Format	Distributing Label	Catalog codes
Japan	December 27, 2013	Radio add date	Victor Entertainment	—N/a
Japan	January 15, 2014	CD single, CD/DVD single, digital download	Victor Entertainment	VICL-36857, VIZL-607
Japan	February 1, 2014	rental CD	Victor Entertainment	VICL-36857
