= Adapt (Sakanaction album) =

Studio album by Sakanaction
- Released: March 30, 2022
- Length: 33:57
- Label: NF

Sakanaction chronology
834.194 (2019)	Adapt (2022)

Adapt (アダプト) is the eighth studio album by Japanese rock band Sakanaction. It was released on March 30, 2022, through their own label NF Records, which is a Victor Entertainment subsidiary.

== Themes ==
The album is a concept album, dealing with what an album is in the digital age. The title "Adapt" is a reference to how the band adapted during the COVID-19 pandemic.

== Release ==
Prior to the album's release, a national tour was held across Japan. The album was released on March 30, 2022. Two singles titled "plateau" and "Shock!" were spawned from the album, the latter of which was used as the theme to the film Lupin's Daughter. The song "Tsuki no Wan" was also used in a commercial for the Toyota Yaris Cross. Another national tour was held after the album's release, in the second half of 2022. Adapt is part of a two album project, with a follow-up album titled Apply initially scheduled to be released in 2023; the release was post-poned as the band took a two-year hiatus due to frontman Ichiro Yamaguchi suffering from depression.

== Track listing ==
Adapt track listing
No.	Title	Length
1.	"To" (塔)	2:17
2.	"Caravan" (キャラバン)	4:19
3.	"Tsuki no Wan" (月の椀)	4:10
4.	"Plateau" (プラトー)	4:25
5.	"Shock!" (ショック!)	5:08
6.	"Eurynome" (エウリュノメー)	4:23
7.	"Shandy Gaff" (シャンディガフ)	4:14
8.	"Friendly" (フレンドリー)	4:57
Total length:		33:57

== Charts ==
Chart performance for Adapt
Chart (2022)	Peak position
Japanese Hot Albums (Billboard Japan)	4
Japanese Albums (Oricon)	4
