= Sayonara wa Emotion =

- "Sayonara wa Emotion" / "Hasu no Hana" single cover.

Single by Sakanaction

from the album 834.194
- Released: October 29, 2014
- Recorded: 2014
- Genre: Rock, folk, electronica
- Length: 4:22
- Label: Victor Entertainment
- Songwriter: Ichiro Yamaguchi
- Producer: Sakanaction

Sakanaction singles chronology
| "Hasu no Hana" (2014) | "Sayonara wa Emotion" (2014) | "Shin Takarajima" (2015) |

"Sayonara wa Emotion" (Japanese: さよならはエモーション, Hepburn: Sayonara wa Emōshon; "Goodbyes Are Emotion") (Japanese pronunciation: [sajonaɾaꜜ wa emoꜜ:ɕoɴ]) is a song by Japanese band Sakanaction from their seventh studio album, 834.194 (2019). Initially used as a 2013 jingle for the yobikō Tōshin High School, the song was recorded in full a year later. It was released on October 29, 2014, as a double A-side single with the song "Hasu no Hana".

== Background and development ==
Sakanaction's singles for their album Documentaly (2011), "Identity" (2010), "Rookie" (2011) and "Bach no Senritsu o Yoru ni Kiita Sei Desu" (2011), were featured in commercials for the yobikō Tōshin High School. The commercials utilized songs Sakanaction had personally wanted to release as singles, and were not written expressly for the commercials. This was unlike "Yoru no Odoriko" (2012), a single by the band which had been specifically commissioned by Mode Gakuen for a commercial.

In March 2013, Sakanaction released their sixth studio album Sakanaction. The album was a result of the band's vocalist and songwriter Ichiro Yamaguchi feeling a new resolution to create music that would resonate with a general pop music audience. The album debuted at number one on Oricon's weekly albums chart, after selling 83,000 copies. This was a record for the band, both in terms of the number of copies that they had sold in one week of a release, as well as the fact that they had never reached number one on an Oricon chart before. The release is currently the band's most successful album, in terms of physical copies sold.

After the release of Sakanaction, Yamaguchi wanted to take an extended break, however because of the strongly positive response that the band had for the album, he felt that he needed to keep on releasing music. Soon after the band finished touring, Yamaguchi worked on a jingle for Tōshin High School, a song that would grow to become "Sayonara wa Emotion". Yamaguchi felt exhausted from the tour and was only able to develop the song's chorus. The chorus was used by Tōshin High School for their commercials, which began airing in September 2013. While Yamaguchi continued to work on "Sayonara wa Emotion", he was contacted to write a song for the film Judge!, which became the song "Eureka".

Originally, Yamaguchi intended for "Sayonara wa Emotion" and "Eureka" to be released as a double A-side single, however suffered writer's block and exhaustion, and could not finish "Sayonara wa Emotion". In its place, the band recorded "Good-Bye", an improvised composition that used musical techniques that he personally wanted to explore. "Good-Bye" / "Eureka" was released in January 2014, and reached number two on Oricon's weekly singles chart. Immediately after the single's release, the band embarked on their Sakanaquarium 2014 Sakanatribe tour, a 22 date Japanese tour featuring performances at Zepp live houses and two dates at the Tokyo Dome City Hall, between January and March 2014. Footage from one of their performances at the Tokyo Dome City Hall was released as a video album on July 30.

== Writing and inspiration ==
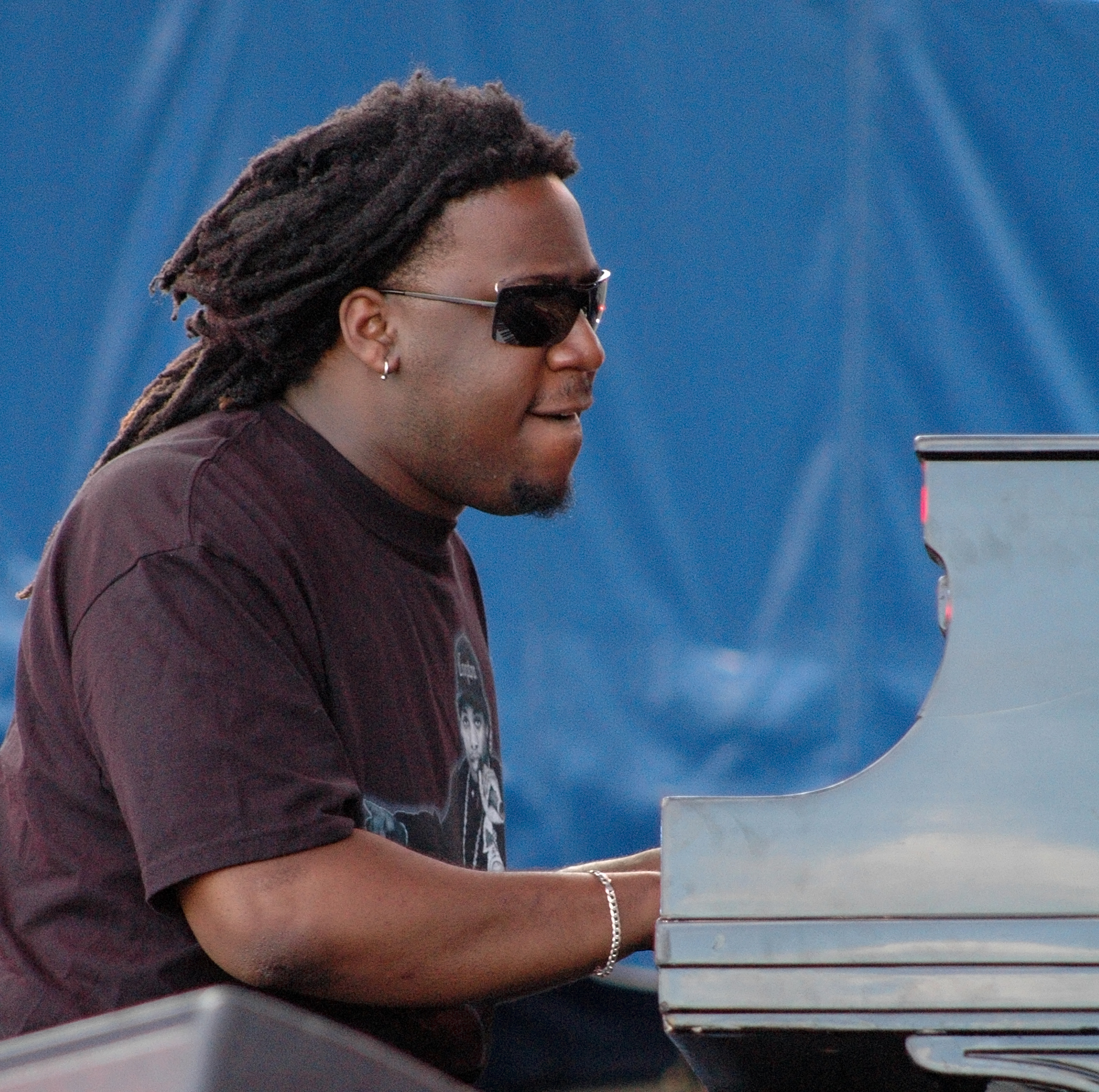
Jazz pianist Robert Glasper inspired Ichiro Yamaguchi to incorporate a dynamic sound range into "Sayonara wa Emotion".

The band first recorded "Sayonara wa Emotion" because of Tōshin High School's request for a song for their commercials in 2013. The band envisioned it as a song to perform at festivals, such as they had done with "Identity" (2010) and "Aoi" (2013). After making two verses and a chorus for the commercial, the band shelved the song, as Yamaguchi had become sick of creating emo rock style songs. The initial take of the song was a halftone lower, used different verses and had different lyrics. The song at this demo stage was given the demo title "Sayonara Emotion" (さよならエモーション).

Yamaguchi attempted to keep working on the song after submitting it for the commercial, but suffered from writer's block, and instead worked on the songs "Eureka" and "Good-Bye". The song was revisited when the band was contacted to write a song for the film Close Range Love (2014), called "Hasu no Hana". The band discussed releasing "Hasu no Hana" and "Sayonara wa Emotion" as a single with their management at Victor Entertainment, who agreed to the idea. The song was entirely rearranged and re-recorded for its 2014 release, based around only the initial version's chorus, with the original verses removed in favor of new ones. Instead of the synth sounds present in the band's other music and the commercial version of the song, Yamaguchi wanted "Sayonara wa Emotion" to have a live rock band sound. Yamaguchi felt that by recording the song in this manner, it had lost its summer music festival-like vibe. During the recording process, Yamaguchi incorporated a wide dynamic range, having felt influenced by listening to jazz and neo soul musicians Robert Glasper and Taylor McFerrin.

The song was recorded at Aobadai Studio in Meguro, Tokyo, in a single take, as a method to retain an emotional feel to the song. The band experimented with the song in demo sessions recorded by their regular recording engineer Masashi Uramoto, while Yamaguchi ad-libbed material. One take of the song was recorded by the project's assistant engineer, Ayaka Toki. The band liked the dynamic nature of her mix, feeling it had a strong indie rock sound, feeling it was similar to a rough recording by an independent band with little sound processing and equalization, and asked Toki to become the leading engineer for the song. The band asked Toki to retain the rough sound of the song for the final mix, believing it was beneficial to expressing the song's dynamic range. The band did not use any of the recording booths at Aobadai Studio, instead recorded in the control room while Toki sat next to the band. As Sakanaction member Ami Kusakari was ill during the recording, the take did not include bass guitar. The other band members felt that this created a strange vibe in the recording studio, as they were used to Kusakari's bassline being the basis for their songs. After her condition improved, Kusakari overdubbed her bass guitar parts into the song.

Lyrically, the song's theme was describing the literal reality of living in Tokyo. This was compared to his previous Tokyo themed songs "Good-Bye" and "Eureka", where the former described Yamaguchi's decision to continue to make music in Tokyo, and the latter was a description of Yamaguchi continuing to live in Tokyo while remembering his home town. The first stanza, describing somebody going to a convenience store late at night, buying a canned coffee and throwing away the receipt, took Yamaguchi the longest time to write. He found that after reaching this point, the remaining lyrics only took a day and a half to finish. He felt that by following the simple description scene with the phrase "sayonara wa emotion", without explicitly linking the two, would mean that listeners would color the scene with the chorus' emotion. Yamaguchi saw this implicit technique being like the lyrical style of 1980s and 1990s lyricists Takashi Matsumoto, Takao Kisugi and Shozo Ise. He wanted the song to evoke the "real" feeling of music from this period, such as by musician Yumi Matsutoya, and felt that the song's title evoked the Shōwa period.

== Composition ==
"Sayonara wa Emotion"
Critics praised "Sayonara wa Emotion" for its minimalist and unified sound, and saw Ichiro Yamaguchi's lyrical delivery as a highlight of the song.

"Sayonara wa Emotion" was described as a "powerful rock anthem" in publicity statements. It is a medium tempo ballad, based around a live rock band sound, without a focus on synthesizers. The song has a "raw, emotional sound", and incorporates choral vocals.

== Promotion and release ==
When recording the song "Hasu no Hana", the band decided that the mid-tempo pop song would pair well with "Sayonara wa Emotion", a "raw and emotional" song, so decided to release these together as a double A-side single on October 29. "Sayonara wa Emotion" / "Hasu no Hana" was the band's 10th physical single release, so to commemorate this, made the release a deluxe CD/DVD package, featuring an EP-like single length and over 50 minutes of DVD footage. The single featured two B-sides, the first of which was a remix of the version of "Ame(B) that Sakanaction performed on their Sakanaquarium Sakanatribe tour, given a stronger club sound by musician Aoki Takamasa. Yamaguchi asked Aoki to create this different mix of the song, as he felt that he had overworked the song. The second B-side was a remix of the band's 2013 single "Music" in an acoustic style by Japanese musician Cornelius. The single's DVD featured two studio live performances that had originally been broadcast on their Ustream channel: "Good-Bye" featuring Tamaki Roy and "Sample", rearranged by Sachio "Sunny" Sasaki, including interviews with both Tamaki and Sasaki. The physical single's cover and booklet were created by Hatos. He attempted to create cover artwork that would make a world view that bridged both songs. The booklet was printed with heat-sensitive ink, so that the "Hasu no Hana" lyrics were only visible when exposed to heat.

Yamaguchi debuted "Sayonara wa Emotion" on Japanese radio on October 23, when he played the song during his regulsr segment on the Tokyo FM radio show, School of Lock!. During the single's promotions, the band performed at English DJ Fatboy Slim's Japan concert on October 19, and performed at the Japan Night in TIMM music event, held at Zepp Divercity Tokyo on October 23. On October 31, the band performed "Sayonara wa Emotion" at the Japanese music program Music Station. For the band's 2015 compilation album Natsukashii Tsuki wa Atarashii Tsuki: Coupling & Remix Works, the song was remixed by female track-maker Qrion.

== Music video ==
The music video for "Sayonara wa Emotion" was directed by Yūsuke Tanaka, who had directed the band's videos for "Bach no Senritsu o Yoru ni Kiita Sei Desu" (2011) and "Yoru no Odoriko" (2012). It was unveiled on YouTube on November 20, 2014, three weeks after the physical single's release date, and a week after the music video for "Hasu no Hana". This was because the band were not able to complete either video in time for the single's physical release. The band enlisted Tanaka for the video, as he had only worked on catchy, comical songs with the band previously. They believed that having him work on a serious song would create an interesting video. The video was primarily shot on a simple sound-stage consisting of two walls and filled with household items, though additional outdoor scenes were shot on the street in front of a building in the Saga area of Koto, Tokyo, owned by the yūgen gaisha Kosuga. The video was shot with a red camera with an anamorphic lens.

The music video begins in color, and follows Ichiro Yamaguchi as he walks along a road at night. He enters a building where he sees his "past self" in monochrome. Inside the room are multiple versions of Yamaguchi repeating actions on loop, such as throwing an apple, and drinking a coffee. In addition to Yamaguchi, the room depicts a "warped world" of the past, where various items are shown in short reversed animation loops, such as clocks, a coat and an inkwell spilling onto paper where Yamaguchi had written the song's lyrics. In the final scenes, Yamaguchi is joined by the other members of Sakanaction, who sit at the table and drink coffee in a repeating loop. The final part of the movie shows Yamaguchi exiting the room, once again in color.

Tanaka's initial idea for the video after listening to the song was to create a monochrome video with a Classical Hollywood cinema feel. He incorporated the video's "seeing the past" theme by pairing the song's lyrics with visual images. He believed that the song's lyrical realism, compared to "Bach no Senritsu o Yoru ni Kiita Sei Desu" and "Yoru no Odoriko", inspired him to do so. Tanaka interpreted the lyrics to be about a person in their past, present and future, so developed a concept of a person looking at their past self for the video. He represented the present by using color, and the past by using monochrome GIF-like time loops. Tanaka came up with the looping effect idea after realizing ten second still scenes of items, as he had originally planned, would not be as interesting or effective as the looped scenes. The two wall sound-stage used for the room scenes was a small and simple space, so Tanaka asked his lighting crew to use a moving shadow technique, involving moving lights on the other side of the walls to create a sense of change. The actions in the video were choreographed by Furitsuke Kagyou Air:man, who had previously worked together with Sakanaction on the videos for "Native Dancer" (2009) and "Bach no Senritsu o Yoru ni Kiita Sei Desu".

== Reception ==
=== Critical reception ===
Tomoyuki Mori of What's In? called "Sayonara wa Emotion" "heart-shaking", and described the song as "an impressive blend of next-level folk, electronica, guitar rock". He personally felt that the song was Yamaguchi's expression that he would continue to explore his artistic abilities, and saw that the band had greatly developed the song in the year since its debut in the Toshin High School commercial, to the point where they had created a new signature song for the band. Mori believed that the song comfortably unified rhythm and sound, while CDJournal reviewers believed that the song's minimal and electronic sound created "a world of Sakanaction", where that the song's comfortable nature gave listeners a floating feeling.

Yuichi Hirayama of EMTG noted that the song felt odd compared to contemporary songs charting in Japan, believing that "Sayonara wa Emotion" expressed reality much stronger than the other songs. He believed that this was a sign that Sakanaction did not write music in response to the Japanese music scene, instead were creative musicians of their own volition independent of the music scene in general. He was impressed by Yamaguchi's sigh-like delivery of the lyrics "katta" and "dashita", feeling his vocals showed the band's furthering development and realism. He also noted realism in the song's "haiku-like" lyrics, especially how the song expressed sadness and solitude solely by creating a description of a scene.

=== Commercial reception ===
"Sayonara wa Emotion" debuted at number four on the Billboard Japan Hot 100 chart, outperforming the single's other A-side "Hasu no Hana", which peaked at number twelve. "Sayonara wa Emotion" received major airplay in its first week of radio airplay, being the sixth most played song on Japanese radio that week. This was slightly worse than "Hasu no Hana", which was the fifth most played song two weeks earlier. After two additional weeks of high sales and airplay, "Sayonara wa Emotion" dropped out of the top 30 most sold or played songs. During its chart run, compared to "Hasu no Hana", "Sayonara wa Emotion" in general received higher charting positions, however, charted for fewer weeks with less intensity than its counterpart.

In its first week, the "Sayonara wa Emotion" / "Hasu no Hana" single reached number four on the Oricon single charts. Both Oricon and SoundScan Japan independently tracked an estimated 21,000 physical copies sold in the single's first week. The single dropped to number 24 in its second week, and only spent these two weeks in the top 30 singles. The release spent a total of six weeks on the top 200 singles chart, selling a total of 27,000 physical copies in this time.

== Track listing ==
All tracks are written by Ichiro Yamaguchi.

Physical single, digital EP
| No. | Title | Length |
|---|---|---|
| 1. | "Sayonara wa Emotion" | 4:22 |
| 2. | "Hasu no Hana (Single Version)" (蓮の花, "Lotus Flower") | 4:45 |
| 3. | "Ame(B) (Sakanatribe × ATM Version)" | 8:13 |
| 4. | "Music (Cornelius Remix)" (ミュージック Myūjikku) | 5:44 |
| Total length: | | 23:04 |

DVD
| No. | Title | Length |
|---|---|---|
| 1. | "Good-Bye Session featuring Tamaki Roy: Broadcasted on Ustream on 2013.11.28" | 14:29 |
| 2. | "Ichiro Yamaguchi x Tamaki Roy Talk Session" | 10:48 |
| 3. | "Sample Studio Live Guest Sachio "Sunny" Sasaki: Broadcasted on Ustream on 2014.8.5" | 24:24 |
| 4. | "Sachio "Sunny" Sasaki Interview" | 8:19 |
| Total length: | | 58:00 |

== Personnel ==
Personnel details were sourced from "Sayonara wa Emotion" / "Hasu no Hana"'s liner notes booklet. Music video personnel information was sourced from Sakanction's official YouTube channel.

Sakanaction

- All members – arrangement, production
- Keiichi Ejima – drums
- Motoharu Iwadera – guitar
- Ami Kusakari – bass guitar
- Emi Okazaki – keyboards
- Ichiro Yamaguchi – vocals, guitar, lyrics, composition

Music video

- Aoi Production – production company
- ENZO – artwork
- Furitsuke Kagyou Air:man – choreography
- Akira Hosoka – producer
- Hisashi "Momo" Kitazawa – stylist
- Sō Nakagaki – location coordinator
- Asami Nemoto – hair, make-up
- Asumi Sato – production manager
- Yūsuke Tanaka – director
- Taidō Takahashi – location coordinator
- Shoji Uchida – camera
- Teruyuki Utsumi – producer
- Akifumi Yone'i – lighting

== Chart rankings ==
| Chart (2014) | Peak position |
|---|---|
| Japan Billboard Adult Contemporary Airplay | 11 |
| Japan Billboard Japan Hot 100 | 4 |
| Japan Oricon weekly singles: "Sayonara wa Emotion" / "Hasu no Hana" | 4 |

=== Sales ===
| Chart | Amount |
|---|---|
| Oricon physical sales: "Sayonara wa Emotion" / "Hasu no Hana" | 27,000 |

== Release history ==
| Region | Date | Format | Distributing Label | Catalog codes |
|---|---|---|---|---|
| Japan | October 23, 2014 | Radio add date | Victor Entertainment | —N/a |
| Japan | October 29, 2014 | CD single, CD/DVD single, digital EP | Victor Entertainment | VICL-36963, VIZL-721 |
| Japan | November 15, 2014 | rental CD | Victor Entertainment | VICL-36963 |
