= 834.194 =

Studio album by Sakanaction
- Released: June 19, 2019
- Genres: Electropop, pop rock
- Length: 88:45
- Label: NF

Sakanaction chronology
Sakanazukan (2018)	834.194 (2019)	Adapt (2022)

834.194 (pronounced 'eight three four one nine four') is the seventh studio album by Japanese rock band Sakanaction. The album is a double album. It was released on June 19, 2019, through their own label NF Records, which is a Victor Entertainment subsidiary.

== Release ==
Prior to the album's release, the band announced an arena tour across Japan. The tour was designed so part of it was held before the album's release, and part was held after, leading to two different experiences. The album was initially scheduled to release on April 24, but was delayed to June 19, 2019. The limited edition of the album came with a 130 minute blu-ray of the band's 10th anniversary concert.

== Track listing ==
Side one - 35 38 52 9000 / 139 41 39 3000
No.	Title	Length
1.	"Wasurerarenai no" (忘れられないの, "Can't Forget")	3:58
2.	"Match to Peanuts" (マッチとピーナッツ, Macchi to Pīnattsu, "Matches and Peanuts")	4:30
3.	"Kagerō" (陽炎, "Heat Haze")	4:33
4.	"Tabun, Kaze" (多分、風。, "Perhaps, the Wind.")	4:52
5.	"Shin Takarajima" (新宝島, "New Treasure Island")	5:05
6.	"Moth" (モス, Mosu)	4:05
7.	"Kikitakatta Dance Music, Liquidroom ni" (「聴きたかったダンスミュージック、リキッドルームに」, Kikitakatta Dansu Myūjikku, Rikiddorūmu ni, "The Music I Wanted to Hear, in Liquidroom")	3:56
8.	"Eureka" (Shotaro Aoyama Remix; ユリイカ, Yurīka)	6:40
9.	"September -Tokyo Version-" (セプテンバー -東京 version-, Seputenbā -Tokyo Version-)	4:54

Side two - 43 03 18 9000 / 141 19 17 5000
No.	Title	Length
1.	"Good-Bye" (グッドバイ, Guddobai)	4:43
2.	"Hasu no Hana" (蓮の花, "Lotus Flower")	4:45
3.	"Eureka" (ユリイカ, Yurīka)	5:37
4.	"Nylon no Ito" (ナイロンの糸, Nairon no Ito, "Nylon Thread")	5:08
5.	"Chabashira" (茶柱, "Tea Stalk")	3:46
6.	"Wonderland" (ワンダーランド, Wandārando)	4:54
7.	"Sayonara wa Emotion" (さよならはエモーション, Sayonara wa Emōshon, "Farewells Are Emotion")	4:19
8.	"834.194"	7:11
9.	"September -Sapporo Version-" (セプテンバー -札幌 version-, Seputenbā -Sapporo Version-)	5:38
Total length:		88:45

== Charts ==
Chart performance for 834.194
Chart (2019)	Peak position
Japanese CD Albums (Oricon)	2
Japanese Digital Albums (Oricon)	1
Hot Albums (Billboard Japan)	2
Top Album Sales (Billboard Japan)	2
