= Good-Bye (Sakanaction song) =

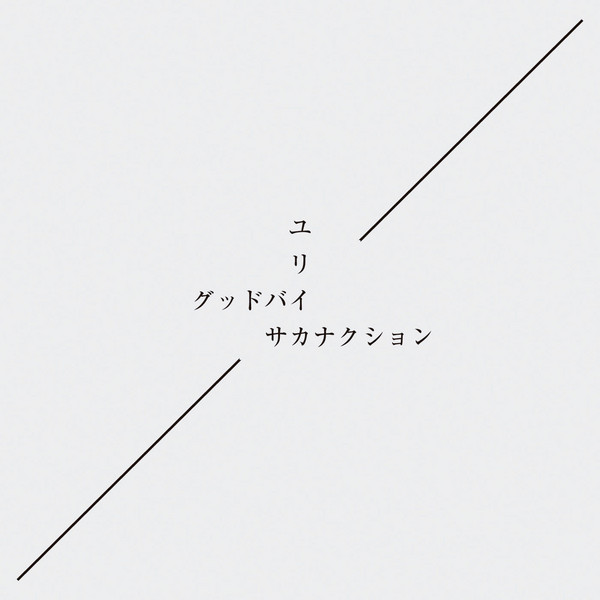
- CD/DVD and digital download editions' cover of "Good-Bye" / "Eureka".

Single by Sakanaction

from the album 834.194
- Released: January 15, 2014
- Recorded: 2013
- Genre: Rock
- Length: 4:41
- Label: Victor Entertainment
- Songwriter: Ichiro Yamaguchi
- Producer: Sakanaction

Sakanaction singles chronology
"Music" (2013)	"Good-Bye" (2014)	"Eureka" (2014)

"Good-Bye" (Japanese: グッドバイ, Hepburn: Guddobai) (Japanese pronunciation: [gɯd:obai]) is a song by Japanese band Sakanaction from their seventh studio album, 834.194 (2019). It was released as a single in January 2014, as a double A-side single with the song "Eureka". A rock ballad primarily based around non-electronic instruments, the song was composed by the band's vocalist Ichiro Yamaguchi about his mental state while physically unwell and mentally frustrated, after being unable to finish writing the song "Sayonara wa Emotion". In January 2014, a remix of the song was used in the NHK documentary program Next World: Watashi-tachi no Mirai, later to be included on the band's compilation album Natsukashii Tsuki wa Atarashii Tsuki: Coupling & Remix Works (2015).

The physical single debuted at number two on Oricon's weekly singles chart, while "Good-Bye" outperformed "Eureka" on the Billboard Japan Hot 100, also reaching number two. Critics received the song well, praising the song for its simple band sound that developed with the additional of guitar feedback, and believed that the song was an expression of a musician reaffirming their identity and their desire to continue into uncharted musical territory.

== Background and development ==
In March 2013, Sakanaction released their sixth studio album Sakanaction. The album was a result of the band's vocalist and songwriter Ichiro Yamaguchi felt a new resolution to create music that would resonate with a general pop music audience, and featured several songs with high-profile commercial tie-ups. The first of these was the band's single "Boku to Hana", released in May 2012, which was used as the theme song for the Tsuyoshi Kusanagi drama 37-sai de Isha ni Natta Boku: Kenshui Junjō Monogatari, Three months later, the band followed this with the single "Yoru no Odoriko", a song that had been featured in commercials for the design school Mode Gakuen from April 2013. A month and a half before the album's release, the band released the single "Music", a song used as the theme song for the Yōsuke Eguchi-starring Fuji Television drama Dinner. Another song found on the album, "Aoi", was commissioned by the Japanese national broadcaster NHK for a theme song for them to use for their 2013 broadcast of soccer events. The band wanted to balance these songs created for a wide audience with songs that they personally wanted to create, so gave the album a Möbius strip theme to illustrate this. The album debuted at number one on Oricon's weekly albums chart, after selling 83,000 copies. This was a record for the band, both in terms of the number of copies that they had sold in one week of a release, as well as the fact that they had never reached number one on an Oricon chart before. The release is currently the band's most successful album, in terms of physical copies sold.

From March to June, the band performed a tour to promote the album, Sakanaquarium 2013. This tour included 19 performances, including two dates at the Makuhari Messe hall, and their first solo-billed overseas performance in Taipei, Taiwan. The band were invited to the 64th Kōhaku Uta Gassen, NHK's annual New Year's music contest, where they performed the album's final single "Music". The band had set themselves a goal to perform two dates at Makuhari Messe, after achieving their goal of performing there once for their previous album, Documentaly (2011). Though the two concerts and their appearance at the Kōhaku Uta Gassen were milestones for the band, the members of Sakanaction did not personally feel that these were achievements, and left Yamaguchi feeling that he wanted to leave a greater impression on the world of music.

After the release of Sakanaction, Yamaguchi wanted to take an extended break, however because of the strongly positive response that the band had for the album, he felt that he needed to keep on releasing music. Soon after the band finished touring, Yamaguchi worked on a jingle for the yobikō Tōshin High School, a song that would grow to become "Sayonara wa Emotion". Yamaguchi felt exhausted from the tour and was only able to develop the song's chorus. While he was working on this song, he was contacted to write the ending theme song for the film Judge!, which he accepted. He shelved "Sayonara wa Emotion" to focus on writing this song, "Eureka", and intended to release "Sayonara wa Emotion" and "Eureka" together as a double A-side single. While he wrote "Eureka", Yamaguchi became sick both physically and mentally, developing hives and becoming disillusioned with the idea of writing music for other entities. The "Good-Bye" / "Eureka" double A-side single was announced on November 25, when the band were still recording "Good-Bye".

== Writing and inspiration ==
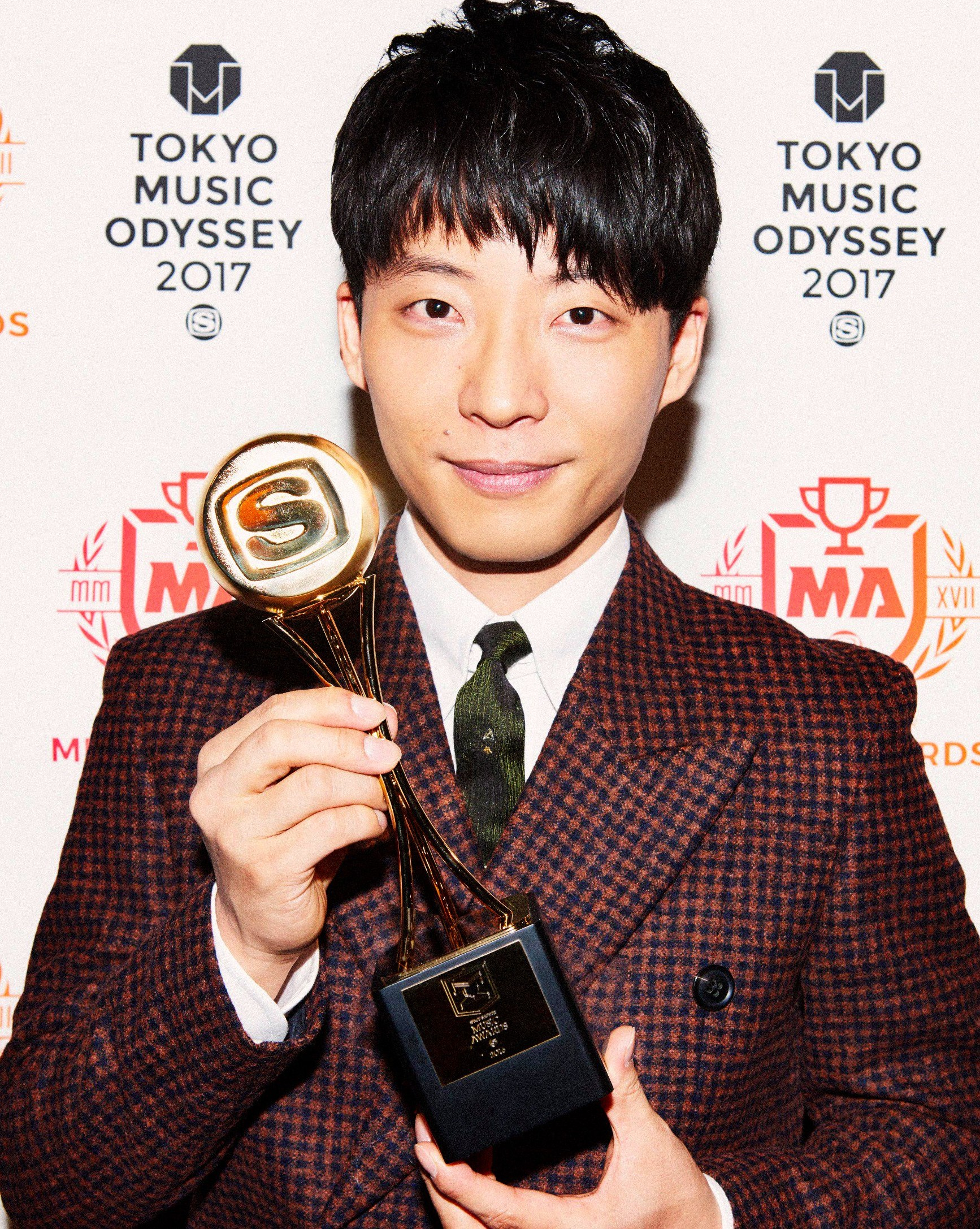
Ichiro Yamaguchi was inspired to write the lyrics of "Good-Bye" by real conversations he had with staff, his bandmates and the musician Gen Hoshino (pictured).

After finishing the recording sessions for "Eureka", he returned to the recording studio to work on the rest of "Sayonara wa Emotion". During these sessions, Yamaguchi improvised an entirely different song, purely using musical techniques that he personally wanted to explore. The composition, "Good-Bye", reminded Yamaguchi of the period when he first started making music. Originally he saw the song as an album track or a B-side, but found the melody had consumed him, and his confidence in the song grew. Yamaguchi felt distressed that he could not complete "Sayonara wa Emotion" during his sickness and exhaustion, and instead developed a strong desire to release "Good-Bye" in its place. Yamaguchi felt embarrassed at this, seeing it as selfishness as a musician. While talking to Tatsuya Nomura (the band's executive producer) about the situation, Nomura reassured him that although suddenly changing plans were not a good thing, it was necessary for him to address his feelings about releasing "Good-Bye". Yamaguchi asked Victor Entertainment's management to liaise with Tōshin High School, to see if they would accept "Good-Bye" in the place of the already submitted chorus of "Sayonara wa Emotion". Though they liked the song, the commercial had already been completed, so they were unable to replace the song, and began airing the commercials with the original song in September 2013.

While creating "Good-Bye", the words and melody came to Yamaguchi at the same time, while he was improvising. The lyrics were directly inspired by conversations that Yamaguchi had with staff, his bandmates, and his friend and fellow musician Gen Hoshino; expressing how he felt in that moment frankly. The title was chosen by Yamaguchi to link with Japanese author Osamu Dazai's 1940s unpublished story Good-Bye. Thematically, the song was written about Yamaguchi's decision to continue to make music in Tokyo, linking to the single's other leading song "Eureka", which was written about living in Tokyo. While recording the song, Yamaguchi considered how an audience would react to the song as it was unveiled, especially the audience of his regular segment on the Tokyo FM radio show on School of Lock!.

Yamaguchi's desire to release music was revitalized when he thought of an idea to stream footage of the band during their recording sessions for the song on Ustream. At one point, the song had developed a hip-hop style arrangement, which made Yamaguchi wonder if the song could be finished by adding a rapper. They band asked Tamaki Roy to collaborate with them during these sessions because of how impressed they were in his freestyle rap skills, which they saw when he sampled Sakanaction's "Eiga" for one of his songs. The day after they asked Tamaki Roy to collaborate with them, the band recorded their collaboration live, and released it as an unannounced guerrilla broadcast uploaded to their Ustream account on November 28, 2013.

== Composition ==
"Good-Bye"
Critics praised the nostalgic sound of "Good-Bye", including its "subtle" guitar-based arrangement.

"Good-Bye" is a medium-tempo ballad with a simple rock band sound. It begins with an acoustic guitar-based rock sound, which dramatically progresses into a sound strongly featuring "emotional" guitar feedback.

== Promotion and release ==
On November 14, 2013, it was revealed that Sakanaction's song "Identity" would be used as the theme song of the film Judge!, while a yet to be released song "Eureka" would be the film's ending credits theme. A week and a half later, it was announced that "Eureka" would be released as a double A-side single with "Good-Bye". On January 15, 2014, two physical editions of "Good-Bye" / "Eureka" were released: a CD-only edition and a CD/DVD edition. Both editions featured a remix of the song "Eiga" from Sakanaction created by electronic musician Aoki Takamasa. The DVD featured the music video for "Eureka", plus a behind-the-scenes documentary of the recording for their live tour video album Sakanaquarium 2013 Sakanaction: Live at Makuhari Messe.

Sakanaction performed "Good-Bye" during a two-hour special episode of Music Station, on January 17, 2014. The next day, the band embarked on their Sakanaquarium 2014 Sakanatribe tour, a 22 date Japanese tour featuring performances at Zepp live houses and two dates at the Tokyo Dome City Hall, between January and March 2014. Footage from the tour final at Tokyo Dome City Hall on March 16 was released as a video album Sakanatribe 2014: Live at Tokyo Dome City Hall, which featured a performance of "Good-Bye". The band's recording session for the song featuring Tamaki Roy that was broadcast in November 2013 was included in the DVD for their single "Sayonara wa Emotion" / "Hasu no Hana", released in October 2014.

The band remixed the song for the NHK documentary special Next World: Watashi-tachi no Mirai (NEXT WORLD 私たちの未来; "Our Future") in January and February 2015. The remixed was compiled onto the band's compilation album Natsukashii Tsuki wa Atarashii Tsuki: Coupling & Remix Works in August 2015.

== Music video ==
The music video for "Good-Bye" was directed by Yukihiro Shoda, who had never worked with the band before, while the band's stylist Hisashi "Momo" Kitazawa served as the creative director of the video. After Shoda discussed the meaning of the word good-bye with Yamaguchi, Shoda and Kitazawa worked together to create the music video without any direct input by the band members. The video was recorded in December 2013, and was unveiled on YouTube on the day of the physical single's release, January 15.

The video features Yamaguchi in the role of a black shawled ferryman, transporting a woman played by Ayami Nakajō across a darkened lake. As they progress across the lake, there are flashbacks to a "painful story" between her and a man, played by Akira Kameyama. Later in the video, the woman is shown embracing the man as he lies collapsed on a skating rink. He appears on the boat, and she reaches out and touches him, but he is no longer there. She sees him standing on the edge of the lake, and smiles at him.

The video was one of the five songs nominated for Best Rock Video at the 2014 MTV Video Music Awards Japan, and was one of the fifty videos shortlisted for the Best Video award at the 2015 Space Shower Music Video Awards.

== Reception ==
=== Critical reception ===
Takushi Yamaguchi of Billboard Japan felt "Good-Bye" was a high-quality song, praising Yamaguchi's emotional vocals. He called the piece a "straight-forward" ballad, and felt that no aspect of Sakanaction was excluded from the song. CDJournal praised the song's "simple band sound" and their "primitively honed" melody and performance. Aki Ito of EMTG thought very highly of the song's "melancholic melody", also praising the "bold progression" of the song's second half. She believed that it added even more strength to the pressing nature of the song's lyrics, and felt that the melody and the lyrics worked together to create something that left a strong impression and memories. She felt that the driving force behind "Good-Bye" was its "subtle guitar".

Dai Onojima of Rockin' On Japan noted that both "Good-Bye" and "Eureka" had definite pop song structures, as opposed to songs that focused on an "instrumental groove" such as on their previous album, Sakanaction. He felt like the song was the story of a musician reaffirming their identity. Tomoyuki Mori of What's In? had a similar opinion, feeling that the "nostalgic" song was an expression of the band's desire to continue into uncharted musical territory.

Reviewing "Good-Bye (Next World Remix)", Yuichi Hirayama of EMTG felt that the remix was "impressive" and tied in well with the NHK documentary's technological focus.

=== Commercial reception ===
Both "Good-Bye" and "Eureka" debuted on the Billboard Adult Contemporary Airplay chart on the same week in early January, with "Eureka" out-performing "Good-Bye" to be the second most played song on adult contemporary radio stations, while "Good-Bye" was only the fifteenth most played song. During this week, "Good-Bye" was exclusively played on adult contemporary radio stations, as it did not enter the top 100 for Billboard's general radio chart, despite "Eureka" being the second most played song. In the next week, "Good-Bye" had overtaken "Eureka" in terms of radio airplay. Over the songs' charting course, "Good-Bye" saw consistently stronger sales and radio airplay. Five weeks after first charting, "Good-Bye" and "Eureka" were no longer noticeably selling or receiving airplay.

As a physical single, "Good-Bye" / "Eureka" reached number two on Oricon's weekly singles chart, underneath boyband Kanjani Eight's single "Hibiki". Oricon tracked 22,000 physical copies being sold in its first week, with a two-week total of 27,000, while the sales tracking agency SoundScan Japan tracked 21,000 copies in the single's first week, with a total of 25,000 copies tracked over two weeks. The single quickly fell out of the top twenty, charting in the top 100 singles for five weeks, and the top 200 singles for eight weeks.

== Track listing ==
All tracks are written by Ichiro Yamaguchi.

Physical single, digital EP
No.	Title	Length
1.	"Good-Bye"	4:41
2.	"Eureka" (ユリイカ Yurīka)	5:33
3.	"Eiga (Aoki Takamasa Remix)" (映画, "Film")	5:02
Total length:		15:16

DVD
No.	Title	Length
1.	"Eureka (Music Video)"
2.	"Behind the Scenes of Sakanaquarium 2013 Sakanaction: Live at Makuhari Messe"

== Personnel ==
Personnel details were sourced from "Good-Bye" / "Eureka"'s liner notes booklet. Music video personnel information was sourced from Sakanction's official YouTube channel.

Sakanaction

- All members – arrangement, production
- Keiichi Ejima – drums
- Motoharu Iwadera – guitar
- Ami Kusakari – bass guitar
- Emi Okazaki – keyboards
- Ichiro Yamaguchi – vocals, guitar, lyrics, composition

Music video

- Akira Kameyama – cast member
- Hisashi "Momo" Kitazawa – stylist
- Yusuke Kobayashi – stylist
- Shinji Konishi – hair, make-up
- Chihiro Matsumoto – art, production designer
- Mazri – production company
- Ayami Nakajō – cast member
- Masaru Nakamura – marine coordination (Total Aquatic's)
- Ryoken Okamura – cameraman
- Takanobu Oki – production manager
- Takahiro Sakamoto – key grip
- Yukihiro Shoda – director
- Atsutoshi Ueno – lighting, gaffer

== Chart rankings ==
Chart (2014)	Peak position
Japan Billboard Adult Contemporary Airplay	5
Japan Billboard Japan Hot 100	2
Japan Oricon weekly singles: "Good-Bye" / "Eureka"	2

=== Sales ===
Chart	Amount
Oricon physical sales: "Good-Bye" / "Eureka"	32,000

== Release history ==
Region	Date	Format	Distributing Label	Catalog codes
Japan	January 9, 2014	Radio add date	Victor Entertainment	—N/a
Japan	January 15, 2014	CD single, CD/DVD single, digital download	Victor Entertainment	VICL-36857, VIZL-607
Japan	February 1, 2014	rental CD	Victor Entertainment	VICL-36857
