= Shin Takarajima (song) =

- CD only, CD/DVD and digital download editions' cover

Single by Sakanaction

from the album 834.194
- Released: September 30, 2015
- Recorded: 2015
- Genre: Alternative rock
- Length: 5:06
- Label: Victor Entertainment
- Songwriter: Ichiro Yamaguchi
- Producer: Sakanaction

Sakanaction singles chronology
"Sayonara wa Emotion" (2014)	"Shin Takarajima" (2015)	"Tabun, Kaze" (2016)

Alternative cover
- 2CD/DVD editions' cover.

"Shin Takarajima" (Japanese: 新宝島; pronounced [ɕintakaɾadʑima], "New Treasure Island") is a song by Japanese band Sakanaction. The band's frontman, Ichiro Yamaguchi, wrote the lyrics and music. Shin Takarajima is the band's 11th single, released on September 15, 2015 by Victor Entertainment. The song was the band's first single since the release of "Sayonara wa Emotion", after which they took a year's hiatus in light of bassist Ami Kusakari's pregnancy. The song was featured in the soundtrack for the live-action film Bakuman and departs from the style of Sakanaction's other albums, featuring pop influences, together with an alternative rock and dance music style.

The title of the song was borrowed from Osamu Tezuka's Shin Takarajima, which Yamaguchi came across while researching manga for musical inspiration. The CD jacket on both the normal release and the initial limited edition displayed typography of the title; releases of the deluxe limited edition featured artwork of Bakuman character Miho Azuki, drawn by the series' artist, Takeshi Obata. The single was highly critically acclaimed, with some critics praising the sound, rhythm, and melodic elements as "a new direction for the band," and others finding it to be a return to the band's roots. "Shin Takarajima" charted number one on Billboard Japan Hot 100, and ranked #9 on the Oricon Singles Chart.

The song's music video was directed by Yūsuke Tanaka, and was produced in homage to the Shōwa-era music and variety show Dorifu Daibakushō. The music video was nominated for Best Traditional Japanese Group Video in the 2015 MTV Video Music Awards Japan. A separate karaoke music video was created by Bakuman director Hitoshi Ohne, designed to evoke the feel of karaoke videos produced in the late 1980s and early 1990s. The video was a self-parody of Bakuman, telling the story of a romance between a male manga artist and a girl. Yamaguchi takes on an acting role in the video. Sakanaction hosted their first live performance of "Shin Takarajima" during the SAKANAQUARIUM NF Records Launch Tour 2015-2016, and has since performed the song on musical programs such as COUNT DOWN TV and Music Station, and at events such as COUNTDOWN JAPAN.

The song was re-released on June 19, 2019 as part of the album 834.194.

== Background and development ==
=== Background and release ===
"Shin Takarajima" is a song that appears in the live-action film Bakuman. In a magazine interview, Bakuman producer Genki Kawamura spoke on the decision to commission Sakanaction to perform music for the film and making "Shin Takarajima" the theme song:

I feel that without good music, a movie can't be successful. [...] As producer, I spent a lot of effort going through musicians. [...] Sakanaction has elements of rock and dance music in their style, and it was those two things I felt that Bakuman the movie needed.

— Genki Kawamura, MEKURU 2015 vol. 6

In another interview with frontman Ichiro Yamaguchi and film director Hitoshi Ohne, production staff asked Ohne why he chose Sakanaction to perform Bakuman's theme song and its background music:

When professional composers create "background music," it doesn't always seem to fit the original work. When I work with instrumentalists or artists, though, their music fits perfectly. So I singled out all the artists I thought could make good background music, and Sakanaction was one of them.

— Hitoshi Ohne, Natalie: Yamaguchi Ichiro x Ohne Hitoshi, Ongaku to Eiga de Aruku "Bakuman." no Riaru no Taidan

Another impetus that drove Ohne to choose Sakanaction was the rock festival he attended, TAICOCLUB, where he saw the band perform. Ohne described the shock he felt and the idea it gave him: "The audience was so wrapped up in their music. If I chose them to perform the music for Bakuman, it might turn into something interesting." The band and the production staff entered into a partnership following this event. The band was tasked with performing the theme song and the movie's background music before casting had been decided.

Shin Takarajima was announced during a Sakanaction launch party, NIGHT FISHING, which took place on September 11, 2015. The band declared the creation of their own label, NF Records, under the banner of Victor Entertainment. The label's first album and single were also announced, and at this time, Sakanaction unveiled its new look. Shin Takarajima was the band's 11th single, and on September 30, 2015, saw a CD release under the NF Records label. The song was released in three formats: normal edition (CD), initial limited edition (CD and DVD), and limited collector's edition (2 CDs and DVD, Bakuman Box). The bonus CD included in the limited editions, called Motion Music of Bakuman, featured every song from the film.

=== Development ===
"Shin Takarajima" drew inspiration from Bakuman, embodying the story of a young man and woman striving to become manga artists. The theme of the song was "to draw a line." The song itself includes lyrics that highlight the "sweat and tears that come from creating," a feeling shared among both manga artists and musicians. After requesting the song approach a second topic, Director Ohne gave Shin Takarajima another title: "The Song of (One's) Self-Effacing Graduation." The film Bakuman includes a scene during the credits where the two protagonists forgo attending their graduation ceremony to talk in a classroom. Ohne requested this theme be worked into the song to lend Shin Takarajima more relevance to the movie.

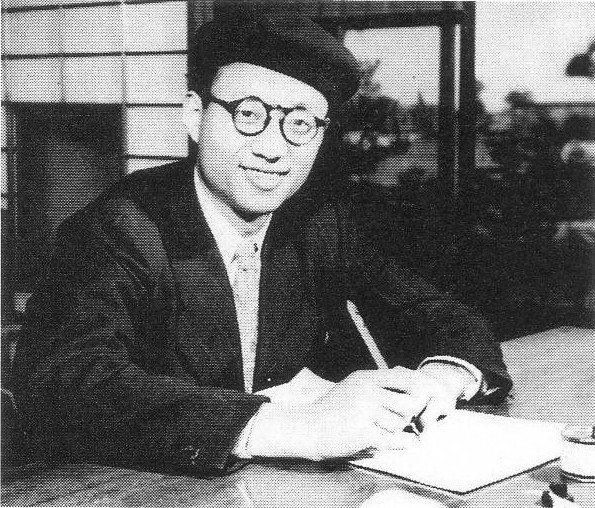
"Shin Takarajima" drew its title from the manga of the same name. Pictured is the artist of the manga, Osamu Tezuka (taken in 1951, 28 years old at the time).

While the song was in development, frontman Yamaguchi read manga outside of his normal purview for the purpose of conducting research. When questioned, he explained, "I felt I needed to study and learn more about making theme songs and background music for manga. I tried to discover the origins of Japanese manga, and that was when I found Osamu Tezuka's works." Yamaguchi chose to incorporate Tezuka's Shin Takarajima as the title of the song. The song's original title was not "Shin Takarajima," but "Touch," taken from a scene in Bakuman where the two protagonists write "touch" on their hands and high-five (In Japanese, "high-fiving" is known as ハイタッチ, or high touch.) This resulted in a conflict due to the Bakuman manga being published in Weekly Shōnen Jump, which also published a manga known as Touch in its Weekly Shōnen Sunday magazine. When brought to the attention of Bakuman production staff, the original title was scrapped, and "Shin Takarajima" was chosen.

Though Shin Takarajima was announced to be releasing after the album Natsukashii Tsuki wa Atarashii Tsuki: Coupling & Remix Works, planning for the song began ahead of the album. In a magazine interview published in July 2015, Yamaguchi described the lyrical process as "the hardest fight [he] had ever gone through," requiring almost 6 months to complete the process. Added to this was an initial deadline set for May 2014, coupled with completion of the song's karaoke version set for fall. As the deadline for the film approached, work on the album was further delayed by bassist Ami Kusakari's pregnancy and loss of inspiration by keyboardist Kiemi Okaza. These combined circumstances resulted in the delay of the album and resulted in difficulties in Shin Takarajima's production. Difficulties ceased when Yamaguchi was inspired by Ohne's dedication to Bakuman; Yamaguchi was quoted as saying, "I began to feel that I couldn't slack off on my own work. I wanted to create something that would satisfy him."

After receiving a script for Bakuman, Yamaguchi described feeling as if he were being encouraged by the director, pushed to create a bright song. The relationship between frontman and director changed how he approached the song. However, in an interview conducted by music magazine Talking Rock, Yamaguchi emphasized his potential audience: "I knew high school and university students were a clear, distinct market. I also understood that what they were after was bright, impactful music. I decided that I should make a song that invited the feeling of leaving everything behind for a brand new story."

Sakanaction included several lines related to their September 2015 launch party, NF, in Shin Takarajima. One line, "I'll take you along, just as you are right now," holds the meaning of, "We'll go with NF, just as it is right now." NF was launched on Yamaguchi's idea that the band wanted to create a space for their listeners, as well as create music that embodied their positive and public feelings. Composition for Shin Takarajima proceeded on this idea, and after the NF launch party, Yamaguchi was purportedly able to finish the lyrics for the song. NF's second event, NF #02, was held in November 2015 and featured a theme taken from Shin Takarajima's lyrics, titled SEN.

== Composition ==
Previous singles "Sayonara wa Emotion" and "Good-Bye" composed by frontman Yamaguchi focused on "shadow" as a motif; by contrast, "Shin Takarajima" took "light" as its theme. On this basis, Sakanaction departed from its usual style, incorporating elements of pop music, alternative rock, and high-energy dance music into the melody. The intro develops an alternative rock theme, with some critics finding this to be a return to the band's origins. Parts of the intro resemble the work of Japanese band Godiego, proceeding, as Yamaguchi explains, into a comical theme with a pop tempo. The song consists only of verses and a chorus. The melody is made to resemble Chinese synthesizer music, with rhythm and pattern akin to computer music. The composition is simple and evokes a style of minimalism. The lyrics are designed to paint the picture of a new world, with references made to NF and the resounding chorus bringing the listener to the world of Bakuman.

== Commercial reception ==
Rival sales tracking agency SoundScan Japan noted that the Bakuman Box version of the single was the most popular edition sold, with 13,000 physical copies tracked. The single's other two physical editions did not chart well enough to be noted in the top twenty releases that week.

== Track listings ==
All tracks are written by Ichiro Yamaguchi.

Physical single, digital EP
No.	Title	Arranger(s)	Length
1.	"Shin Takarajima" (新宝島)	Sakanaction, Yuzuru Tomita	5:06
2.	"Kikitakatta Dance Music, Liquid Room ni" (「聴きたかったダンスミュージック、リキッドルームに」, "The Dance Music I Wanted to Hear at the Liquid Room")	Sakanaction	4:00
3.	"Inner World (Aoki Takamasa Remix)" (インナーワールド Innā Wārudo)	Sakanaction, Aoki Takamasa	5:16
4.	"Shin Takarajima (Instrumental)"	Sakanaction, Tomita	5:04
Total length:			19:24

Limited edition bonus CD
No.	Title	Music	Arranger(s)	Length
1.	"Motion Music of Bakuman"	Sakanaction	Sakanaction	34:54
Total length:				34:54

DVD
No.	Title	Length
1.	"Shin Takarajima (Karaoke Video)"	5:08
2.	"Shin Takarajima (Karaoke Making Video)"	23:00
3.	"Karaoke Box Talk Session"	39:17
4.	"Shin Takarajima (Karaoke Video, Song Included)"	5:08
Total length:		72:33

== Charts ==
Chart (2015)	Peak position
Japan Billboard Japan Hot 100	1
Japan Oricon daily singles	5
Japan Oricon weekly singles	9

== Certification and sales ==
Region	Certification	Certified units/sales
Japan (Oricon) (physical single sales)	—	35,000
Japan (RIAJ)	2× Platinum	500,000^{*}
Streaming
Japan (RIAJ)	2× Platinum	200,000,000^{†}
^{*} Sales figures based on certification alone.^{†} Streaming-only figures based on certification alone.

== Release history ==
Region	Date	Format	Distributing Label	Catalog codes
Japan	September 4, 2015	Radio add date	NF Records	—N/a
Japan	September 30, 2015	CD single, CD/DVD single, 2CD/DVD single, digital download	NF Records	VIZL–885, VIZL–886, VICL–37102
Japan	October 17, 2015	rental CD	NF Records	VICL–37102
Taiwan	November 20, 2015	CD	Rock Records	GUT2504.4
