= Yobikō =

Type of school in Japan

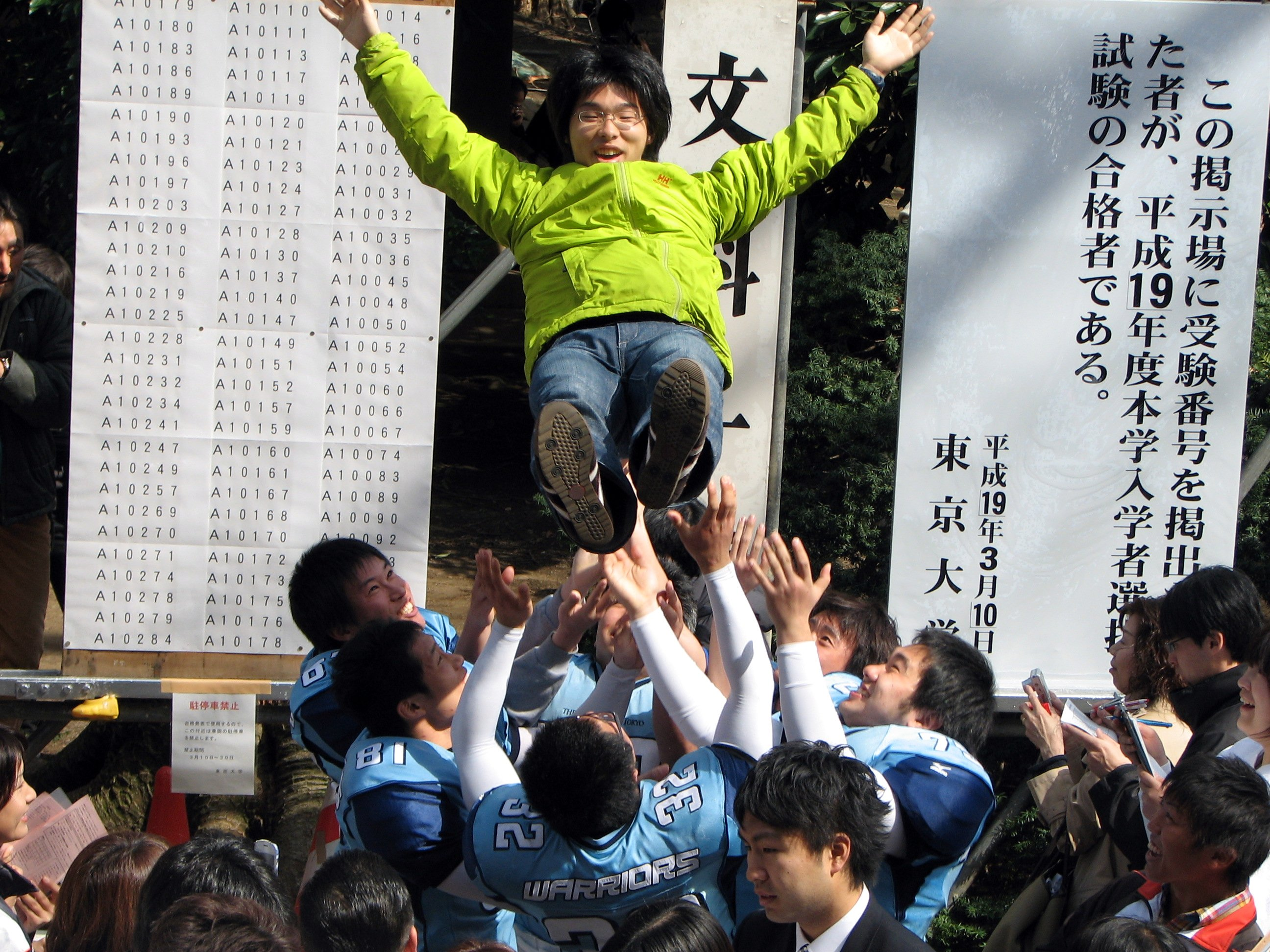
At Tokyo University, at the announcement of test results, a successful student is being thrown into the air in celebration.

Yobikō (予備校) are privately-run schools in Japan marketed to students preparing for university entrance examinations, which take place annually from January to March. Yobikō students generally graduated from high school but failed to enter the school of their choice during their first attempt at the exam. The test, unlike the French baccalauréat and the South Korean College Scholastic Ability Test, has different versions, with different schools looking for results from different exams. In Japan, the test is generally considered the most important event in a child's education. Students who fail may spend a year or more studying to retake the examination; they are colloquially referred to as rōnin. Yobiko are similar to juku except for differences such as curriculum, legal status, and the main type of students who attend (juku mainly focus on younger students and are not necessarily focused on entrance exams).

== Legal status ==
Yobikō are for-profit private corporations that are officially listed as schools by Japan's Ministry of Education, Culture, Sports, Science and Technology. At the municipal level, they are supervised by boards of education. Even so, they are subject to little supervision: the main focus of inspections is on compliance with regulations for physical conditions, while curricula and teacher salaries are not inspected.

== Types ==
Yobikō enrollment varies widely by institution. The most common are those for each city, with enrollment typically not exceeding 500 students. National yobikō or mammoth yobikō have 10,000 students or more.

Some yobikō prepare students to pass specialized entrance exams, such as those for medical and art schools. These typically have fewer than 100 students and charge higher tuition than general yobikō.

== Structure ==
=== Curriculum ===
Designed to prepare students to pass college entrance exams, the curriculum prioritizes memorizing facts and learning exam-taking strategies. A study of a typical yobikō found that the curriculum consisted of studying questions that were on previous exams, specific ways to improve answers, and specific topics that would be covered in the exam.

=== Personnel ===
Most yobikō instructors are casual and regular part-time teachers, including retired teachers and teachers affiliated with another school. A few are regular full-time teachers.

=== Students ===
Most students are rōnin, high school graduates who have failed the college entrance exam and are preparing to take it again. As rōnin students, they attend yobikō classes full-time. Junior high school students and high school seniors are known to attend after their regular school hours and on Sundays.

=== Monitoring ===
The quality of teaching is observed and evaluated by methods such as classroom recording reviews and student feedback surveys.

=== Mock exams ===
Students take mock exams throughout the year. Scores are made public so students are able to compare their scores with the scores of other students to find their academic standing. Based on their scores, students know whether they can meet the required entrance test scores required by the institution to which they plan to apply.

== Attendance and popularity ==
Family spending on private higher education is as common as that for public higher education. The OECD reported that in 2013, private spending accounted for about 66 percent of higher education costs and about 80 percent of that amount came from households (p. 2-3).

One of the most well-known yobikō is the Kawai Juku. Although it is considered a juku, among the courses it offers are classes specifically for entrance exam preparation, giving it yobikō-like characteristics. It appeals not only to rōnin students but also to a wide range of age groups, as classes are offered to students from elementary school to college (Kawaijuku Group, 2012).

Japan’s low juvenile crime rate may be in part because children who attend yobikō or juku, in addition to regular school, have less free time.

== Disadvantages ==
Yobikō are not equally accessible to students. A national survey and a survey on the Hiroshima branch of a yobikō, which could be considered a typical one, found that more males attend yobikō than females. One reason is that a female rōnin is frowned upon in Japanese society. Also, not all students can afford to attend yobikō.

The strain on family income created by the expenses of sending children to yobikō or juku may be contributing to the declining birth rate in Japan.

== See also ==
- Cram school
- Juku
- History of education in Japan
- Education in Japan
- University-preparatory school
- Jaesusaeng
- Sundai Preparatory School
