= Richard Castelli =

Richard Castelli (born May 9, 1961) is a producer, artistic consultant and curator of numerous exhibitions associated with art, science, performance, or new technologies.

== 1980-2003: Producer, graphic designer and film director, Art Zoyd ==
From 1982 to 2003, he started as producer of the French new music band Art Zoyd, for which he also designed the lighting of the shows and graphics of the LPs and CDs.

During this period, he wrote scripts and directed short and medium-length films with the music of the band, among others Dernière danse (1982) and Ceremony (1984), Art Zoyd - Ceremonie with Philippe Blanc, Art Zoyd & Vorgänge Upon the Heath (1988) with Christophe Jouret awarded Best musical film by the Rio de Janeiro International Film Festival and First Prize of the Estavar Festival), and broadcast on several channels worldwide.

== 1990-2007: Head of programming, curator ==
In the '90s, he became head of programming of two national theatres in France, Le Manège scène nationale in Maubeuge from 1990 to 2007 and Maison des Arts of Creteil from 1993 to 2007.

During this period, he initiated the co-production of international projects with theatre directors Robert Lepage, Peter Stein, Robert Wilson among others, and he specifically developed the Exit festival in Creteil and the Via festival in Maubeuge, as well as media art exhibitions.

He was Senior Curator of Lille 2004 - European Capital of Culture (1999-2005), then Lille 3000 (2005-2007).

== From 1995: Founder of Epidemic ==
In 1995, Richard Castelli founded Epidemic (the name refers to Lars von Trier's movie), a production company supporting international artists in the field of performing arts and new media. The artists produced by Epidemic since its creation are theatre/cinema directors Jean Michel Bruyère (France) and Robert Lepage (Canada), new media artists Dumb Type (Japan), Du Zhenjun (China), Ivana Franke (Croatia), Granular-Synthesis, Kurt Hentschlager (Austria), Shiro Takatani (Japan), Ulf Langheinrich (Germany), Jeffrey Shaw (Australia) and Sarah Kenderdine (New Zealand), The User (Canada), music composer and visual artist Ryoji Ikeda (Japan), choreographers Édouard Lock (Canada), Rihoko Sato and Saburo Teshigawara (Japan).

== From 2005: Curatorship and artistic direction ==
In 2005, Richard Castelli expanded the activities of Epidemic with the creation of an exhibition department to present artworks of the leading new media artists in the fields of digital art, sound and light art, robotic art, etc. He curated several exhibitions in Germany (Licht! Ljus! Lumière! at Haus der Berliner Festspiele in 2005 and Vom Funken zum Pixel at Martin-Gropius-Bau in 2007–2008, in Berlin), and co-curated The Art of Immersion I with Dennis Del Favero and Peter Weibel at the ZKM - Center for Art and Media in Karlsruhe in 2017-2018. Recently he was appointed as chief curator of the exhibition Dimensions, Digital Arts since 1859 featuring about 60 artworks from the pioneers to contemporary artists in a space covering 10,000 square meters of a former factory in Leipzig in 2023. In 2024, he co-curated the exhibition À la recherche de Vera Molnar in Budapest, an international tribute to the artistic legacy of Vera Molnar, a pioneer of computing art, who died shortly before her 100th birthday in 2023.

He was also curator of five exhibitions for the Romaeuropa Festival in Italy, two of which in co-operation with the Museum of Contemporary Art of Rome MACRO Testaccio (2010 and 2016), and the last at the Palazzo delle Esposizioni in Roma (2017).

In France, the curated two exhibitions commissioned by Bethune Capitale Régionale de la Culture in 2011: Matière-Lumière and Transformer and also exhibitions in the national performing arts centres Bonlieu Scène nationale Annecy, Maison des Arts de Créteil, Le Volcan in Le Havre, Le Manège in Maubeuge, La Filature in Mulhouse and le lieu unique in Nantes.

As part of the exhibition Robotic Art, which he curated for the Cité des sciences et de l'industrie in Paris in 2014-2015, was inaugurated the 3D Water Matrix, a computer controlled display of animated three-dimensional liquid artworks, he designed, from an original idea he discussed with artist Shiro Takatani in 2000.

The 3D Water Matrix received the CODAawards Winner 2015 in the category "institutional".

He was also the artistic director of the Francofffonies! Québec_numériQ event featuring the Quebec avant-garde artists in digital arts at Théâtre du Châtelet in Paris in 2006.

Outside Europe, he was invited to organise or co-curate several exhibitions in China, in the major museums of Beijing (NAMOC - Musée National d'Art de Chine in 2008), Shanghai (Zendai MoMA in 2006 and 2008, Sculpture Art Space in 2007, Science and Technology Museum in 2008, Power Station of Art in 2017) and Chengdu (inaugural exhibition of the new relocated A4 Contemporary Arts Center newly entitled LUXELAKES•A4 Art Museum in 2017).

In 2010 and 2011, he curated the two exhibitions Madde-Isik 1 and Madde-Isik 2 in Istanbul (Borusan Foundation).

In Russia, Richard Castelli is the first and to date the sole foreign artistic director of Nikola-Lenivets Archstoyanie Architecture Festival, located 200 km away from Moscow. For this 9th exhibition held in 2014, he focused on the notion of temporality in architecture.

He is author of several essays, including Robots d'artistes ou robots artistes? in the collective book Robots extraordinaires published by Futuroscope FYP (2006), Hu Jieming, A World in Thickness, a monography of the Chinese artist Hu Jieming, published by Li Zenhua, Shanghart (2010), A Future where we are already in in Romaeuropa Digitalife 2010 2011 2012 - Human Connections.
