= Thomas Steiner =

Thomas Steiner may refer to:

- Thomas Steiner (director) (born 1956), Austrian film director and painter
- Thomas Steiner (politician) (born 1967), Austrian politician
