= Takatani =

Takatani (written: 高谷) is a Japanese surname. Notable people with the surname include:

- Shiro Takatani (高谷 史郎; born 1963), Japanese artist
- Sohsuke Takatani (高谷 惣亮; born 1989), Japanese sport wrestler
