= Stefan Sonvilla-Weiss =

Stefan Sonvilla-Weiss (born April 10, 1961, Wels) is an Austrian media scholar, artist, and designer. He studied visual media with Peter Weibel and earned a Master of Arts degree at the University of Applied Arts Vienna in 1986. He later completed his academic pursuits with a Doctor of Philosophy in Communication theory from the same institution. Sonvilla-Weiss's work encompasses a diverse range of disciplines, including art, design, media and communication. His contributions extend to various publications that reflect his multidisciplinary approach.

== Academic career ==
He served as a full professor at Zayed University in Abu Dhabi from 2021 to 2026. Before this role, he was a media design professor and dean at the University of Art and Design Linz from 2014 to 2021. He began his international academic career as a visiting professor at the University of Art and Design Helsinki, which later became Aalto University in 2003. He was promoted to professor in 2007 and directed the international MA program ePedagogy Design – Visual Knowledge Building from 2005 to 2014.

== Creative and practice-based research ==
His scholarly work addresses the intersections of social, technical, and aesthetic dimensions in digital participatory media, including interactive and mixed media and multimodal communication sites. Notable monographs include Spaces of Commemoration and Communication (2023), which examines commemorative culture and its transformation towards interactive and participatory experiences through a novel form of visitor engagement at the Mauthausen Memorial Visiting Center. In Synthesis and Nullification: Works 1991-2011 (2012), Sonvilla-Weiss represents a broad theoretical and practical exploration of visual culture, seeking experimental investigation and application that foster a state of continuous change.

== Books ==
- Spaces of Commemoration and Communication. A Novel Approach at the Mauthausen Memorial Visitor Center. Columbia University Press 2023. ISBN 9783837667332
- VIS-À-VIS Medien.Kunst.Bildung. Lebenswirklichkeiten und kreative Potentiale der Digital Natives. DeGruyterBrill 2017. ISBN 9783110499964, eBook ISBN 9783110498516
- Synthesis and Nullification. Works 1991-2011. Springer Science+Business Media 2012. ISBN 978-3-7091-1028-7
- Future Learning Spaces. Aalto Art Books 2012, ISBN 978-952-60-4517-7
- Mashup Cultures. Springer Science+Business Media 2010, ISBN 978-3-7091-0095-0
- IN)VISIBLE. Learning to Act in the Metaverse. Springer Science+Business Media 2008, ISBN 978-3-211-78538-6
- (e)Pedagogy - Visual Knowledge Building. Rethinking Art and New Media in Education. Peter Lang 2005, ISBN 978-3-03910-609-7
- Virtual school – kunstnetzwerk.at Partizipative Medienkultur in der virtuellen Bildungslandschaft Österreichs. Peter Lang 2003, ISBN 978-3-03910-231-0
