= Teshigawara =

Teshigawara (written: 勅使川原) is a Japanese surname. Notable people with the surname include:

- Ikue Teshigawara (勅使川原 郁恵, born 1978), Japanese speed skater
- Saburo Teshigawara (勅使川原 三郎), Japanese choreographer and dancer
