= Ulf Langheinrich =

German visual artist and composer

- Born: February 20, 1960 (age 66); Wolfen, Sachsen Anhalt, East Germany
- Occupations: Visual artist Composer

Ulf Langheinrich (born 1960 Wolfen, East Germany) is a visual artist and composer.
His work is mainly concerned with non-narrative environments and performances focusing on a specific approach to time, space and body. Since 2016 he is the Artistic Director of the International Festival for computer based art CynetArt in Dresden, Germany.

== 1980–1991 ==
After studying industrial design he conducted audio-experiments using pipe organs, harmoniums and multiple tape machine environments as well as engaging mainly in drawing. He left East Germany in 1984 for West Germany, where he started to develop the basics of his language in painting, photography and electronic music.

In 1988 he moved to Vienna pursuing his activities in his studio in the WUK (Werkstätten und Kulturhaus) which resulted to an exhibition and the publication of a catalogue of his artworks.

== 1991–2003: Granular-Synthesis ==
In 1991 in Vienna, he co-founded with Austrian artist Kurt Hentschläger the duo GRANULAR-SYNTHESIS. Their name refers to the technique of "granular synthesis", they apply to both sound and image, creating a new audiovisual language
In more than a decade they created monumental multimedia installations and performances such as AREAL (1997–2004), FELD (2000), MODELL 5 (1994–2007), NOISEGATE (1998) or the latest POL (1998–2008). Figurative or abstract, immersive and monumental, sometimes interactive, their works were conceived in a theatrical approach and marked a new step in the aesthetic of perception.
They toured worldwide in the most prestigious spaces and festivals.
Several compilations of GRANULAR-SYNTHESIS works have been released on DVDs and they received the first prize of the International Biennial in Nagoya in 1995 as well as stipendiums in Austria and the USA.

== Since 2003: Solo projects ==
Ulf Langheinrich has been producing a new series of large scale solo projects, among others PERM -an interactive abstract film created for the EVE Interactive Cinema system designed by Pr Jeffrey Shaw (2005), HEMISPHERE (2006), designed for a hemispheric screen (2006) or LAND, a stereoscopic installation commissioned by Liverpool Biennial 2008. His works were shown at various festivals and museums in Europe, Asia, North America and Australia.
Featured artist of the Ars Electronica Festival in 2005, he received a stipendium from Siemens for the creation of his installation WAVEFORM B.
The same year, he directed his first full-length film DRIFT in full HD, commissioned by the Australian Centre for the Moving Image

His longstanding interest in combining classical music with electronic music and HD images, led him to compose the score of SINKEN in 1998 -with GRANULAR-SYNTHESIS- for symphonic orchestra and electronic in Dangerous Visions, commissioned and performed by Orchestre National de Lille and New Music French group Art Zoyd. Since this first live experiment, other similar creations followed including MINUS (still with GRANULAR-SYNTHESIS, 2002), and later under his own name, SYNTONY for the Festival d'Art Lyrique of Aix-en-Provence (2005), DRIFT LIVE (2006) again for Wien Modern and KU for TONLAGEN Festival for contemporary music in Dresden in 2010.

Many of his works were also created in collaboration with various artists, mostly as models, using a part of their body, as American singer/performer Diamanda Galas was for GRANULAR-SYNTHESIS' work POL (1998), performer Michael Ashcroft for the duo's pieces WE WANT GOD NOW (1995), AREAL (1997) and FORM (2000).
Japanese dancer Akemi Takeya -her face- was also the model of GRANULAR-SYNTHESIS masterpiece MODELL 5 (1995) and short piece SWEETHEARTS (1996). Ulf Langheinrich collaborated again with her later, when she asked him to design the audiovisual environment on her two body performances CE_1 and Weathering in 2005–2006.
Other collaborations include the series of performances and installations MOVEMENT A (2008), MOVEMENT B (for the opening of the Hong Kong City University School of Creative Media in 2011), MOVEMENT X and MOVEMENT Y (2010) with Japanese dancer Toshiko Oiwa, MOVEMENT C (2012) and MOVEMENT Z (2014) with Chinese dancer Luo Yuebing and VORTEX, a dance performance for four dancers with stereoscopic, in collaboration with Italian choreographer Maria Chiara de' Nobili (2020).
He also worked on the music and sound design of the performance "N" for French choreographer Angelin Preljocaj in 2004 and co-directed the short film SPINTEX with British artist Gina Czarnecki in Ghana in 2008.
In 2015 he created the images and collaborated to the lighting design of the opera SOLARIS by Dai Fujikura and Saburo Teshigawara, after Stanislas Lem's novel, premiered at Théâtre des Champs-Élysées and toured at Lille Opera and Lausanne Opera.

As composer, he released the CD DEGREES OF AMNESIA (Asphodel Records).
In 2013 was published the DVD Visionaries 21: The Aesthetic Of Sensory, featuring his solo works from 2002–2010.

Over the last years, besides his artistic activities, Ulf Langheinrich has been appointed to teach in the most prestigious high schools in Europe (HGB University for Graphics and Book Design, Leipzig, FH Salzburg and Le Fresnoy, Studio national des arts contemporains in Tourcoing), as well as in Australia (RMIT in Melbourne) and China (Hong Kong City University School of Creative Media and China University of Art in Hangzhou).

From 2016 to 2020 he was Artistic Director of the festival CynetArt, based in Dresden.

== Works ==
=== Installations and videos ===
- B (1991)
- PERM, special creation for Jeffrey Shaw's EVE dome (2003)
- SOIL (2003-2011)
- WAVEFORM B (2005)
- LIGHT (2005)
- WAVEFORM A (2005)
- DRIFT (2005)
- OSC (2005-2014)
- DUSK (2007)
- DE NATURA SONORIS TEMA (2007)
- DE NATURA SONORIS Red (2007)
- DE NATURA SONORIS Woman Walking (2007)
- SPINTEX (2009) with Gina Czarnecki
- LAND (2008–2010)
- XXX (2010)
- ALLUVIUM (2010), special creation for Jeffrey Shaw's immersive 3D 360° AVIE
- MOVEMENT X, 3D (2010)
- MOVEMENT Y (2010)
- IMZK (2013)
- MUSIC I, 3D (2005-2013)
- NO LAND II, 3D (2005-2014)
- NO LAND III, 3D (2005-2014)
- NO LAND I, 3D (2008-2014)
- NO LAND IV (2009-2014)
- MUSIC III LAG, 3D (2011-2014)
- MUSIC II, 3D (2013-2014), for the AVIE by Jeffrey Shaw
- MOVEMENT Z, 3D (2014), for the AVIE by Jeffrey Shaw, with Luo Yuebing
- HEMISPHERE, creation for suspended hemispheric dome or planetarium (2006-2016)
- I MISS YOU (2016)
- GHOST, special creation for the 3D WATER MATRIX (2017-2018)
- LOST, creation for suspended hemispheric dome or planetarium (2017)
- OSC-L, outdoor site-specific project in London (2018)
- NIL (2018)
- QSL (2018)
- NOLANDX, 3D (2019)
- WAVEFORM X, 3D (2019)
- OSC-K, outdoor site-specific project in Karslruhe (2020)
- WAVEFORM Z (2022)
- OSC-B, outdoor site-specific project in Barcelona (2022)
- WAVEFORM L, commissioned by Stiftung für Kunst und Kultur e.V., for Dimensions — Digital Art since 1859 exhibition in Leipzig (2023)
- MOVEMENT L, commissioned by Stiftung für Kunst und Kultur e.V., for Dimensions — Digital Art since 1859 exhibition in Leipzig (2023)
- NOLAND-D (2023)

With GRANULAR-SYNTHESIS:

- SWEET HEART (1996)
- NOISEGATE (1998)
- FORM (2000)
- FELD (2000)
- RESET (2001)
- LUX (2003)

=== Dance performances & cinematic live shows ===
- WEATHERING (2004) with Akemi Takeya
- "N" (2004) with the Ballet Preljocaj and Kurt Hentschläger
- CE_I (2005) with Akemi Takeya
- MOVEMENT A (2007) with Toshiko Oiwa
- MOVEMENT B (2011)
- DRIFT_LINE_BLUE (2011)
- MOVEMENT C (2012) with Luo Yuebing
- FULL ZERO (2016) with Luo Yuebing
- VORTEX (2020) with Maria Chiara de'Nobili

With GRANULAR-SYNTHESIS:

- MODELL5 (1994–2007)
- AREAL (1997–2004)
- POL (1998–2008)
- SINKEN (for Dangerous Visions, with Art Zoyd and the Lille National Orchestra) (1999)
- FORMEN (Zulu Time, by Robert Lepage / Ex Machina) (1999)
- <360> (2002–2003)
- MINUS (2002)

=== Visual concerts ===
- SYNTONY (2005)
- KU, for pipe organ (2010)
- SINKEN II for 44 musicians (1999-2015)
- RE-TIME, for string orchestra (2015)

== Awards ==
With GRANULAR-SYNTHESIS:

- Austrian Furtherance Prize for new media art (1993)
- GRAND PRIX Open Competition ARTEC (1995)
- Austrian Federal State Grant for Fine Art (1999)
- PS1 Residency New York City (1999)

== Bibliography ==
=== Books ===
- Enfoldment and Infinity: An Islamic Genealogy of New Media Art (Leonardo Book Series), Laura U. Marks (2010). The MIT Press. ISBN 0-262-01421-1, ISBN 978-0-262-01421-2
- Art contemporain nouveaux médias, Dominique Moulon (2011). Nouvelles Éditions Scala, coll. "sentiers d'art". ISBN 2-35988-038-1, ISBN 978-2-35988-038-0
- Multimedia Performance, Rosemary Klich and Edward Scheer (2011). Palgrave Macmillan ISBN 978-0-230-57467-0, ISBN 0-230-57467-X

With GRANULAR-SYNTHESIS:

- The Diana "Lichtwerk", Georg Schöllhammer (1990), Redesign Diana, Vienna
- Interview with Hentschläger/Langheinrich, Ursula Hentschläger (1993). Medien. Kunst. Passagen, Vienna
- Motion Control - Ein elektronischer Bildersturm?, Birgit Richard (1996). Norbert Bolz (Hg), Riskante Bilder, Munich
- GRANULAR SYNTHESIS, Mike Stubbs (1998). Gerfried Stocker und Christine Schöpf (Hg), INFOWAR, Vienna
- Cinematic Folds: the furling and unfurling of images, Firoza Elavia (2008), Toronto. Pleasure Dome, ISBN 978-0-9682115-4-0
- Art and Electronic Media, Edward A. Shanken (2009), London. Phaidon, ISBN 978-0-7148-4782-5
- See this sound: Versprechungen von Bild und Ton = Promises in sound and vision, Rainer Cosima, Stella Rollig, Dieter Daniels, Manuela Ammer (2009). Lentos Kunstmuseum, Linz. Cologne. König, ISBN 978-3-86560-683-9
- We Are the Real Time Experiment: 20 Years of FACT, Mike Stubbs, Karen Newman, Lewis Biggs (2010). FACT, Foundation for Art and Creative Technology, ISBN 978-1-84631-229-8
- Hybridkultur, Yvonne Spielmann (2010). Berlin: Suhrkamp, ISBN 978-3-518-29572-4
- Entangled: Technology and the transformation of performance, Chris Salter (2010). Cambridge, Mass. MIT Press, ISBN 978-0-262-19588-1
- Form +code in design, art, and architecture, Casey Reas (2010). New York. Princeton Architectural Press, ISBN 978-1-56898-937-2

=== Catalogues of exhibitions ===
- Incheon International Digital Art Festival 2010. Curator Dooeun Choi, Yukiko Shikata (2010). ISBN 9788995472828
- Cinemas of the Future. Curator Richard Castelli (2004). Lille2004 European Capital of Culture, Lille. ISBN 90-76704-61-9
- Hybrid Living in Paradox. Ars Electronica, Linz (2005)
- From Flash to Pixel, Zendai MoMA, Shanghai (2006). Curator Richard Castelli (Epidemic)
- Vom Funken zum Pixel, Berliner Festspiele - Martin-Gropius-Bau Berlin (2007). Curator Richard Castelli (Epidemic). Nicolai Verlag ISBN 978-3-89479-434-7
- Body Media. Curator Richard Castelli (Epidemic) & Gong Yan (O Art Centre). Body Media-International Interactive Art Exhibition, Shanghai (2007). ISBN 9787806857762
- eLANDSCAPES - Shanghai eARTS Festival. Curator Richard Castelli (2008)
- Space inventions, Der künstliche Raum. Curator Gottfried Hattinger (2010). Peter Bogner, Künstlerhaus, Vienna ISBN 978-3-900926-86-1 / SCHLEBRÜGGE.EDITOR ISBN 978-3-85160-184-8
- Panorama 12 - Soft Machines (2010). Le Fresnoy, Studio national des arts contemporains, Tourcoing. ISBN 9782917696040
- Madde-Işık (Matter-Light), Istanbul (2010). Curator Richard Castelli (Epidemic)
- Matière-Lumière, Béthune (2011) Curator Richard Castelli (Epidemic)
- The [Secret] Return of Noever. Published in conjunction with an exhibition about Peter Noever, former director of the Österreichisches Museum für Angewandte Kunst, curated and hosted by SCI-Arc at the Ace Museum, Los Angeles (2011)
- DIMENSIONS - Digital Art since 1859. Organised by Stiftung für Kunst und Kultur e.V. Bonn in Leipzig. Curator Richard Castelli, co-curators Dan Xu, Clara Blume (2023). ISBN 9783868327489

With GRANULAR-SYNTHESIS:

- Zeitschnitte 92: Aktuelle Kunst aus Österreich Differenzen, Affinitäten und Brüche, Museumsquartier, Vienna (1992)
- The 4th International Biennale in Nagoya - ARTEC '95, Nagoya (1995)
- Frankensteintechnodrug. Andreas Spiegl (1995). Gerbel, Karl und Weibel, Peter (Hg), Mythos Information. Welcome To The Wired World, catalogue Ars Electronica, Vienna-New York
- DEAF '95, Rotterdam (1995)
- Elektra 96. Elektra manual. Montreal (1996)
- Granular-Synthesis, mädchen.apparate.kunst. medien, apparate, kunst Projektionsräume (1996). Beispiele apparativer Kunst in Österreich, MAK, Vienna
- Sweet Heart. Media Art Biennale WRO97, Wroclaw (1997)
- Granular-Synthesis: NOISEGATE M6, Peter Noever, Vienna (1998). ISBN 3-89322-417-3 / ISBN 978-3-89322-417-3
- Face to face to cyberspace. Curator Markus Brüderlin. Fondation Beyeler, Basel (1999). Beyeler, Ernst (Hg.). Hatje Cantz.
- Musiques en Scène, l'exposition, Musée d'art contemporain de Lyon (2000)
- ... der körpererfüllte Raum fort und fort. Curator Elisabeth Schweeger (2000). OK Centrum für Gegenwartskunst, Linz. ISBN 3-85307-028-0
- GRANULAR-SYNTHESIS - Austrian Pavilion. Venice Biennial, Curator Elisabeth Schweeger (2001), Vienna. ISBN 3-7757-9094-2
- FELD, Granular-Synthesis. Curator Lawrence Rinder and Jungoo Bahk (2002). 2002 Media Art: Special Effects. Lee Joongki, Park ILHo, Daejeon
- Cinemas of the Future. Curator Richard Castelli (2004). Lille2004 European Capital of Culture, Lille. ISBN 90-76704-61-9
- SWEET HEART, Granular-Synthesis. Text by Rudolf Frieling (2006). 40yearsvideoart.de - Part 1, Digital Heritage: Video Art in Germany from 1963 until the Present. ISBN 3-7757-1718-8 / ISBN 978-3-7757-1718-2
- Sculpture Art Space. Curator Richard Castelli (Epidemic) & Gong Yan (O Art Centre). Body Media-International Interactive Art Exhibition, Shanghai (2007)
- eARTS / eLANDSCAPES, Shanghai (2008). Curator Richard Castelli (Epidemic)
- Sounds & visions : Artists' films and videos from Europe: the last decade (2009). Curator Gioè, Angelo and Maria Rosa Sossai. Cinisello Balsamo, Milano: Silvana Editoriale
- Madde-Işık (Matter-Light), Istanbul (2010). Curator Richard Castelli (Epidemic)
- DIMENSIONS - Digital Art since 1859. Organised by Stiftung für Kunst und Kultur e.V. Bonn in Leipzig. Curator Richard Castelli, co-curators Dan Xu, Clara Blume (2023). ISBN 9783868327489

=== Art Press ===
- Ulf Langheinrich, The Useless And Fascinated Look, Alessio Galbiati (May 2008). Digimag n°34. Digicult – Digital Art, Design & Culture
- Ulf Langheinrich - Temporalités multiples. Dominique Moulon. MCD #59, Paris (1 July 2010)

With GRANULAR-SYNTHESIS:

- Welcome to MediaMOO**** Type. Birgit Flos. DU, Zürich (January 1995)
- Festival Manca. Denis Fortier. Le Monde, Paris (December 1995)
- Granular Synthesis, Paolo Cecchetto. Juliet Art Magazine, #76, Trieste (1996)
- Global Ear. Erik Davis. Wire, San Francisco (January 1997)
- Binäre Tänze, Arnd Wesemann. Ballett international. tanz aktuell, Seelze (May 1997)
- Ganzkörpermassage, Thomas Wolkinger. Die Presse, Vienna (25 October 1997)
- Pixel gegen Bio-Einheiten, Christian Schachinger. Der Standard, Vienna (25 October 1997)
- Körper-Experimente im psychotischen Triebwerk: Granular=Synthesis im Steirischen Herbst. Salzburger Nachrichten (27 October 1997)
- Robin Rimbaud crosses the NoiseGate with Granular Synthesis, Robin Rimbaud. The Wire #174, London (August 1998)
- POL, fascisme musical ou génie précurseur ?, Annick Rivoire. Libération, Paris (18 September 1998)
- GRANULAR SYNTHESIS, Interview with Kurt Hentschläger, Claudia Hart. ARTBYTE Vol. 1, no. 5 (Dec. 1998 - Jan 1999)
- Maximales Lärmen, Johanna Hofleitner. Die Presse, Vienna (20 January 1999)
- Maschinenmenschen im dunklen, Raum, Brigitte. Borchhardt-Birbaumer. Wiener Zeitung, Vienne (28 January 1999)
- Höllentore und Ausbruch statt Input, Sabine Buchwald. Süddeutsche Zeitung, Munich (19 February 1999)
- Between Spell and Irritation: NOISEGATE, GRANULAR SYNTHESIS, Bernard Lamarche. Le Devoir, Montreal (17 April 1999)
- Machine Dreams, Christopher Phillips. Art in America (November 1999)
- Attachez vos tuques !!!, François Toussignant. Le Devoir, Montreal (15 November 1999)
- Sensory assault on audience in Bradford, Michael Bracewell. The Independent, London (6 August 2000)
- FIELD OF BEAMS: GRANULAR SYNTHESIS explores the landscape of digital culture, Graham Shearing. Pittsburgh Tribune-Review (3 November 2000)
- Flash-Portions, Birgit Richard. Kunstforum Vol. 151 (July - September 2001)
- Ihr macht sehr elitäre Kunst, Dieter Buchhart. Documentation of the Venice Biennial, Kunstforum Vol. 156 (August - October 2001)
- Grandeur de l'art qui s'accomplit, François Toussignant. Le Devoir (15 November 2003)
- GRANULAR SYNTHESIS. Art World China (January 2004)
- Kill Bill Vol.3, Arnd Wesemann. ballettanz, Berlin: Friedrich Berlin Verlag (July 2004)
- GRANULAR SYNTHESIS. Art World China (May 2009)

=== Essays ===
- Hybrid Living in Paradox - Emptiness, Hissing and Control On Ulf Langheinrich's Oeuvre, Marc Ries, Ars Electronica catalogue (2005)

With GRANULAR-SYNTHESIS:

- Modell 3.1: A multi-media live environment by Kurt Hentschläger and Ulf Langheinrich, Thomas Feuerstein. Text of the catalogue TRANSIT 92
- Pyramedia / Granular-Synthesis Modell 3.02, Thomas Feuerstein. Grundmann, Heidi (Hg), Transit #1, Innsbruck (1993)
- Eikon # 10–11, Nina Edge (1994)
- Motion Control - Shared Pain: Man and Machine. Birgit Flos. MOTION CONTROL. MODELL 5 by GRANULAR SYNTHESIS at the Kunstverein, Hanover (1995)
- Granular-Synthesis. Tom Sherman (1998)
- Hearing the Noise: Revolution. Leoudak, Zoe. International Symposium on Electronic Art (ISEA98). Sculpture Magazine, Vol.18 No. 4, Liverpool (May 1999)
- GRANULAR SYNTHESIS - NOISEGATE, Rob Dyer. National Museum of Photography, Film & Television, Bradford. (2000) http://www.dso.co.uk/gig39.htm
- Noisegate, Robert Clark. National Museum of Photography, Film & Television, Bradford (2000)
- Long Hard Looks / Het verlangen van het luisteren, Over de esthetiek van verstoring in de installatiekunst van Granular Synthesis. Pieter Verstraete. NY, (19 March 2010)

== Discography ==
- DEGREES OF AMNESIA (CD, 1998)
- Vol1 (Vinyl, 2012)

== Videography ==
- Is This Art? - Volume 3: Digital Dreams and Old World Photography (2007). DVD featuring an interview Ulf Langheinrich. Artfilms Ltd. Australia
- Visionaries 21: The aesthetic of sensory overload, The work of Ulf Langheinrich - Vol. 3 (2013). Contemporary Art Media, Artfilms Ltd., Australia. ISBN 978-1-922007-65-0

With GRANULAR-SYNTHESIS:

- GRANULAR-SYNTHESIS - IMMERSIVE WORKS (2004)

A DVD compilation containing extracts and documentation of Granular Synthesis' work over ten years. ZKM Karlsruhe / Cantz. ISBN 978-3-7757-1351-1

- INDEX 003 / GRANULAR SYNTHESIS - REMIXES FOR SINGLE SCREEN

Remixes for Single Screen RESET, 2001, 25 min, and "MODELL 5", 1994–1996, 30 min, ARGE INDEX (Medienwerkstatt Wien & sixpackfilm)

- 40yearsvideoart.de - Part 1 (2006)

Digital Heritage: Video Art in Germany from 1963 to the Present. DVD-Rom featuring an excerpt of SWEET HEART (7'30, 1997). Rudolf Frieling & Wulf Herzogenrath / Hatje Cantz Verlag, Germany

- VIDEORAMA : ARTCLIPS FROM AUSTRIA (2009)

DVD featuring an excerpt of LUX (4', 2002). Vienna: Kunsthalle / Bern: Benteli

== Links ==
- http://ulflangheinrich.com/
- https://soundcloud.com/ulf-langheinrich
- https://granularsynthesis.info
- http://www.epidemic.net/en/art/langheinrich/index.html
