= Shiro Takatani =

Japanese artist (born 1963)

Shiro Takatani (高谷 史郎, Takatani Shiro; born October 15, 1963 in Nara) is a Japanese artist. He currently lives and works in Kyoto. Co-founder and visual creator of the group Dumb Type since 1984, he also became artistic director of the group from 1995 and also started an active solo career in 1998.

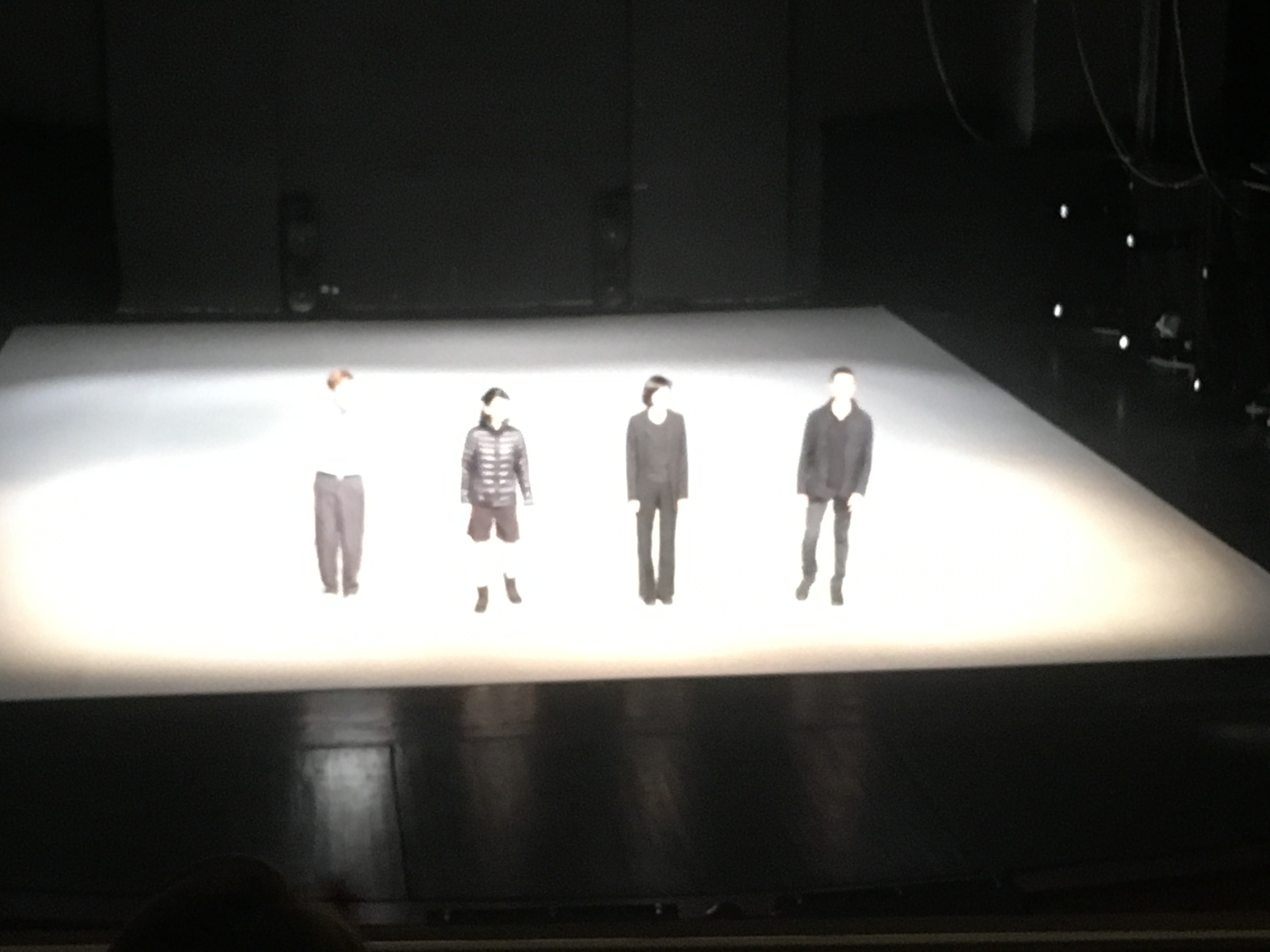
Shiro_Takatani and Chroma team - Bulgaria, plovdiv, October 2017, One Dance Week

== Biography ==
=== Dumb Type ===
Graduated from Kyoto City University of Arts, Shiro Takatani co-founded Dumb Type in 1984 with other students from different sections of the university, including Teiji Furuhashi, Toru Koyamada, Yukihiro Hozumi, Misako Yabuuchi and Hiromasa Tomari.

Dumb Type began touring around the world and got recognition with their multidisciplinary shows Pleasure Life (1988), and pH (1990–1995) and S/N (1992–1996)

After the death of the artistic director Teiji Furuhashi in 1995, some members left the company, while new ones joined it, as the composer Ryoji Ikeda. They continued working under Shiro Takatani's direction and created the performances OR (1997–1999), memorandum (1999–2003), Voyage (2002–2009), and the related installations OR (1997), Cascade (2000), Voyages (2002) and MEMORANDUM OR VOYAGE (2014). A new performance 2020 was staged by Takatani and the new members of Dumb Type without audience in Kyoto during COVID-19 pandemic and in 2022 Dumb Type represented Japan at the Venice Biennale.

=== Solo Projects ===
Alongside his activities within Dumb Type, Takatani has created a number of installations and performances under his own name.

Since his first installation frost frames, created at Canon Artlab in 1998, Takatani has been invited by museums, festivals and theatres worldwide.

Among others, he was commissioned by the Natural History Museum of Latvia in Riga to create two video installations: Ice Core and Snow Crystal / fiber optic type, for the group exhibition "Conversations with Snow and Ice", dedicated to Ukichiro Nakaya' scientific work on snow and ice, in 2005. This exhibition was one of the nominees for the Descartes Award for Excellence in the Explanation of Scientific phenomena in 2007).

The following year he was hosted in residence in Australia and presented the installation Chrono in Melbourne, as part of the Australia-Japan exchange program "Rapt! 20 Contemporary Artists from Japan", commissioned by the Japan Foundation.

He also joined the three-week British expedition "Cape Farewell" (a cultural response to climate change) in the Arctic, with scientists, writers, journalists and other artists from different countries. The related group exhibition was presented at the National Museum of Emerging Science and Innovation in Tokyo, in 2008.

His more recent creations include the laser installation Silence (2012), commissioned by Radar, Loughborough University Arts, the fog installation Composition (2013) for the Sharjah Biennial in the United Arab Emirates and one of the first animation artworks for the 3D WATER MATRIX, inaugurated at the exhibition "Robotic Art" at the Cité des sciences et de l'industrie in Paris, in 2014.

Some of his installations are part of permanent collections of museums, for example Camera lucida (2004) and Toposcan / Ireland 2013 at the Tokyo Metropolitan Museum of Photography and optical flat / fiber optic type (2000) at the National Museum of Art in Osaka.

In 2013, the Tokyo Metropolitan Museum of Photography presented Camera lucida, a dedicated exhibition with a wide range of the video and photographic artworks, he created both as solo artist and artistic director of Dumb Type.

Another solo exhibition, held at the Kodama Gallery in Tokyo in 2014, featured his photographic series Topograph and frost frame Europe 1987.

Takatani also created and directed three theatre/dance performances: La chambre claire (2008), referring to Roland Barthes's essay la camera lucida, CHROMA (2012), inspired by Derek Jarman's Chroma: A Book of Color, with original music by Simon Fisher Turner, and ST/LL (2015) in which he is exploring how to consider the micromeasure of time and whether "art or science can ever truly express this hourglass world".

=== Collaboration Projects ===
Shiro Takatani has collaborated with musicians, choreographers and other artists from many disciplines.

In 1990, he participated with Akira Asada in the art project Stadsmarkeringen Groningen - Marking the City Boundaries, led by architect Daniel Libeskind for the 950th anniversary of the City of Groningen in the Netherlands.

In 1998, he was commissioned by Art Zoyd and the Lille National Orchestra to create video images for a piece of the first cycle of Dangerous Visions, a project combining symphonic music, new musical technologies and images.

At this period, composer Ryuichi Sakamoto noticed Takatani's work and asked him to undertake the visual direction of his opera LIFE, created in 1999. This marked the start of a fruitful collaboration between the two artists. They co-created later, in 2007, the installation LIFE - fluid, invisible, inaudible ... at Yamaguchi Center for Arts and Media [YCAM] (as well as an updated version in 2013), silent spins with sound designer Seigen Ono at the Museum of Contemporary Art in Tokyo in 2012. They also participated together in three performances directed by Moriaki Watanabe: Project Mallarmé I, II and III, combining text, music, theatre and dance, at the Kyoto Performing Arts Center - Shunjuza, from 2010 to 2012. During 2013–2014, they presented in Yamaguchi Center for Arts and Media [YCAM], on the occasion of its 10th anniversary, their performance LIFE WELL (with the participation of Noh actor Mansai Nomura), an installation with the same title and a new one: water state 1. Furthermore, Takatani was the visual director for Sakamoto's project Forest Symphony in 2013 and they collaborated again for a special version of LIFE-WELL, commissioned for the 20th anniversary of the Park Hyatt in Tokyo, in 2014. Other collaborations with Sakamoto include the installations PLANKTON - A Drifting World at the Origin of Life (2016), based on photographs by French biologist Christian Sardet, async (2017) and the theatrical performance TIME (2021). This "wordless opera", featuring dancer and actor Min Tanaka and shô player Mayumi Miyata was inspired by the first story from Soseki Natsume’s collection of short stories Ten Nights of Dreams.

Since his first collaboration with fog sculptor Fujiko Nakaya at the 1st International Biennial of Valencia in 2001, for the outdoor installation IRIS at the port of the city, Takatani co-signed two more large-scale installations with her: CLOUD FOREST (2010), inside and around the Yamaguchi Center for Arts and Media [YCAM], and a fog sculpture in the Asuka Historical National Park in Nara.

Among other collaborations, he contributed in the exhibition Kichizaemon X (2012–2013), consisting of images screened on potters made by Raku Kichizaemon XV at Sagawa Art Museum, and he co-signed the 4K video installation Mars with Xavier Barral, for the international festival of photography Kyotographie at the Museum of Kyoto.

He also co-created several performances with Noh actor Mansai Nomura: Sanbaso / Eclipse and Boléro, both performed at the MOT - Museum of Contemporary Art Tokyo), and Aoi no ue, The Double Shadow, directed by Watanabe Moriaki, at the Kyoto Performing Arts Center - Syunjuza.

Takatani's works were presented, among others, at the GREC festival in Barcelona, the Martin-Gropius-Bau in Berlin, Kwai Tsing Theatre in Hong Kong, Israel Museum in Jerusalem, ZKM, Lille 2004 - European Capital of Culture, Royal Academy of Arts and Tate in London, Musée d'art contemporain de Lyon, Festival de Otoño in Madrid, Centre Pompidou, Fondation Cartier pour l’art contemporain in Paris, Romaeuropa festival / MACRO in Rome, Power Station of Art, Shanghai, Sharjah Art Foundation, Singapore International Festival of Arts, National Theater & Concert Hall in Taipei, Museum of Contemporary Art Tokyo, NTT InterCommunication Center - ICC and New National Theatre Tokyo, Yamaguchi Center for Arts and Media [YCAM].

In 2015, Takatani received the 65th Prize of Fine Arts (Media Art) from the Ministry of Education of Japan and the Kyoto Prefecture Cultural Award in 2019.

== Works ==
=== Installations ===
- Toposcan/Tokyo (2020), commissioned by Tokyo Photographic Art Museum
- Black to Light (2019), in-store installation, Hermès Paris
- Toposcan / Baden-Württemberg (2016), commissioned by ZKM Karlsruhe
- MEMORANDUM OR VOYAGE - Dumb Type (2014), commissioned by the Museum of Contemporary Art Tokyo
- ST\LL, a liquid animation for the 3D WATER MATRIX (2014)
- Toposcan/Morocco (2014)
- Toposcan/Ireland (2013)
- frost frame Europe 1987 (2013)
- mirror type k2 (2013)
- Composition (2013)
- silence (2012)
- photo-gene (2007)
- Chrono (2006), commissioned by the Japan Foundation as part of Australia-Japan exchange program "Rapt! 20 Contemporary Artists from Japan"
- Ice Core (2005), commissioned by the Natural History Museum of Latvia, Riga, as part of "Conversations with Snow and Ice" exhibition
- Snow Crystal / fiber optic type (2005), commissioned by the Natural History Museum of Latvia, Riga, as part of "Conversations with Snow and Ice" exhibition
- Camera Lucida (2004), permanent collection of Tokyo Metropolitan Museum of Photography
- optical flat / fiber optic type (2000), permanent collection of the National Museum of Art, Osaka
- frost frames (1998)

=== Performances ===
- ST/LL (2015), co-produced by Le Volcan - Scène Nationale du Havre, France, Biwako Hall - Center for the Performing Arts, Shiga, Japan, and Fondazione Campania dei Festival – Napoli Teatro Festival Italia
- CHROMA - concert version (2013)
- CHROMA (2012), co-produced by Biwako Hall - Center for the Performing Arts, Shiga
- La chambre claire (2008), co-produced by Theater der Welt 2008

=== Collaboration works ===
- Ryuichi Sakamoto + Shiro Takatani: TIME, theatrical performance (2021)
- Fujiko Nakaya + Shiro Takatani: Chronotope in the City of Fog, fog installation (2020)
- Ryuichi Sakamoto + Shiro Takatani: Fragments, visual concert launching Singapore International Festival of Arts (2019)
- Fujiko Nakaya: Fog x FLO, fog installation (2018)
- Ryuichi Sakamoto: dis.play, visual concert (2018)
- Glenn Gould Gathering (2017)
- Ryuichi Sakamoto: IS YOUR TIME exhibition (2017)
- Ryuichi Sakamoto: Artists Studio, visual concert (2017)
- Ryuichi Sakamoto: async exhibition (2017)
- London Fog #03779, fog installation with Fujiko Nakaya + Ryuichi Sakamoto + Min Tanaka at the Tate Modern London (2017)
- Sayuri Yoshinaga + Ryuichi Sakamoto: For Peace, charity concert (2016)
- Toposcan/Mozuyaguro - Rokyo with Raku Kichizaemon XV + Chojiro (2016)
- Le Soulier de satin by Paul Claudel, directed by Moriaki Watanabe (2016)
- PLANKTON - A Drifting World at the Origine of Life: installation with Christian Sardet and Ryuichi Sakamoto (2016)
- Aoi no ue / L'ombre double (2014), visual direction for the performance directed by Moriaki Watanabe (Kyoto Performing Arts Center - Syunjuza)
- LIFE-WELL Park Hyatt version (2014), fog and sound installation in collaboration with Ryuichi Sakamoto, at Park Hyatt Tokyo
- ST\LL, First artwork for the 3D Water Matrix (2014), Merit CODAawards Winner 2015 - category "Institutional" in 2015
- Mars (2014), installation in collaboration with Xavier Barral
- Sanbaso / Eclipse (2014), with Mansai Nomura, commissioned by the Museum of Contemporary Art Tokyo
- Boléro (2014), with Mansai Nomura, commissioned by the Museum of Contemporary Art Tokyo
- LIFE - fluid, invisible, inaudible ... (2013), ver.2, installation with Ryuichi Sakamoto, commissioned by Yamaguchi Center for Arts and Media [YCAM]
- water state 1 (2013), installation with Ryuichi Sakamoto
- LIFE-WELL (2013), installation with Ryuichi Sakamoto
- Forest Symphony (2013), visual direction for the project by Ryuichi Sakamoto
- LIFE-WELL (2013), Nô and Kyôgen performance in collaboration with Ryuichi Sakamoto and Mansai Nomura
- Mallarmé Project III (2012), visual direction for the performance by Moriaki Watanabe
- silence spins (2012), installation with Ryuichi Sakamoto + Seigen Ono
- collapsed (2012), installation with Ryuichi Sakamoto
- Kichizaemon X (2012), installation with Raku Kichizaemon XV
- Asuka Art Project (2011), lighting design for the fog installation by Fujiko Nakaya
- Mallarmé Project II - Igitur (2011), visual direction for the performance by Moriaki Watanabe
- Mallarmé Project (2010), visual direction for the performance by Moriaki Watanabe
- CLOUD FOREST (2010), installation with Fujiko Nakaya, commissioned by Yamaguchi Center for Arts and Media [YCAM]
- This is how you will disappear, video direction for the performance by Gisèle Vienne at Festival d'Avignon
- Keiichiro Shibuya playing piano solo, Shiro Takatani playing visuals (2009)
- LIFE-fluid, invisible, inaudible ... (2007), installation with Ryuichi Sakamoto, commissioned by Yamaguchi Center for Arts and Media [YCAM]
- Live with Softpad (2007), special creation at Espace Sculfort in Maubeuge and Maison des Arts de Créteil
- Garden Live with Ryuichi Sakamoto (2007) at Daitokuji-temple, Kyoto
- Live with Rei Harakami (2006) at Liquidroom, Tokyo, Sonar Sound Tokyo
- Live with Rei Harakami (2005) at Kyoto University Seibu-Kodo Hall and SONAR, Barcelona
- Garden Live with Ryuichi Sakamoto (2005) at Honen-in, Kyoto
- Live with Rei Harakami (2004) at Namura Art Meeting, Osaka and Sonar Sound Tokyo 2004
- IRIS (2001), installation with Fujiko Nakaya, commissioned by the 1st Biennial of Valencia
- LIFE (1999), visual direction for the opera by Ryuichi Sakamoto
- Dangerous Visions (1998), visual creation for the project by Art Zoyd and Orchestre National de Lille

== Exhibitions and Performances ==
=== Solo exhibitions ===
2020

- BLACK TO LIGHT, in-store installation, Ginza Maison Hermès, Tokyo

2019-2020

- Dumb Type : ACTIONS+REFLEXIONS, MOT - Museum of Contemporary Art Tokyo
- BLACK TO LIGHT, in-store installation, Hermes Paris
- Topograph/Toposcan, Kodama Gallery Tokyo

2018

- Dumb Type : ACTIONS+REFLEXIONS, Centre Pompidou-Metz

2016

- Toposcan/Baden-Württemberg (2016), permanent collection, ZKM Karlsruhe

2014

- Topograph and frost frame Europe 1987, Kodama Gallery, Tokyo

2013

- Camera Lucida, Tokyo Photographic Art Museum
- LIFE-WELL installation, Noda-jinja shrine (outdoor), Yamaguchi

2007

- photo-gene, Kodama Gallery, Tokyo

2004

- Camera Lucida - experimental studies, Kodama Gallery, Osaka

2001

- frost frames, Chapelle des Carmélites, Toulouse

2000

- frost frames, Kyoto Art Center, Kyoto
- optical flat / fiber optic type, Kodama Gallery, Osaka

=== Group exhibitions ===
2023

- DIMENSIONS - Digital Art Since 1859 / Pittlerwerke, Leipzig, organised by Stiftung für Kunst und Kultur e.V., curated by Richard Castelli with Dan Xu and Clara Blume.

2021

- Ryuichi Sakamoto + Shiro Takatani: IS YOUR TIME - TPE / Taipei Music Center, Taipei
- Ryuichi Sakamoto + Shiro Takatani: seeing sound, hearing time / M WOODS Museum, Beijing

2020

- Ryuichi Sakamoto + Shiro Takatani - water state 1 / Yamaguchi Center for Arts and Media (YCAM), Yamaguchi
- Yebisu International Festival for Art & Alternative Visions 2020: The Imagination of Time / Tokyo Metropolitan Museum of Photography, Tokyo

2018

- MeCA | Media Culture in Asia: A Transnational Platform, The Japan Foundation Asia Center, Tokyo

2017

- 3D Water Matrix / VIA Festival, Le Manège - Scène Nationale de Maubeuge
- Visions 2017 / Halles de Schaerbeek/Hallen van Schaarbeek, Brussels
- Body Media II / Power Station of Art, Shanghai
- Digitalife 8 / Romaeuropa Festival, Rome
- Reenacting History Collective Actions and Everyday Gestures / National Museum of Modern and Contemporary Art (Dumb Type)
- Polar Patterns | Art and Antarctica / RMIT Project Space Gallery, Melbourne

2016

- Digitalife 7 / Romaeuropa MACRO Testaccio - La Pelanda, Rome
- Le Grand Orchestre des Animaux / Fondation Cartier pour l'art contemporain, Paris
- GLOBALE: New Sensorium / ZKM, Karlsruhe

2015

- Open Space / NTT InterCommunication Center [ICC], Tokyo

2014

- Seeking New Genealogies — Bodies / Leaps / Traces / Museum of Contemporary Art, Tokyo
- City and Nature / Sapporo International Art Festival, Hokkaido Museum of Modern Art, Sapporo
- Kyotographie - international photography festival / The Museum of Kyoto Annex
- Art Robotique / Cité des sciences et de l'industrie, Paris

2013

- ART-ENVIRONMENT-LIFE - YCAM 10th Anniversary, Yamaguchi Center for Arts and Media [YCAM]
- Re:emerge, Towards a New Cultural Cartography - Sharjah Biennial 11 / Sharjah Art Foundation New Art Spaces, Sharjah
- Kichizaemon X, special exhibition "teahouse of light" / Sagawa Art Museum, Shiga
- Kyotographie - international photography festival / Saigyo-an, Kyoto

2012

- AfterGold / Radar, Loughborough University
- Kichizaemon X: Takatani Shiro + the 15th Raku Kichizaemon / Sagawa Art Museum, Shiga
- Art & Music - Search for New Synesthesia / Museum of Contemporary Art Tokyo, Tokyo

2011

- Matière-Lumière / Le 360, Bethune

2010

- Digital Life / Romaeuropa, La Pelanda-MACRO, Rome
- Yebisu International Festival for Art & Alternative Visions / Tokyo Metropolitan Museum of Photography, Tokyo

2009

- Ecology and Art – Thinking About the Earth Through Art: From Nearby to Far Away / Gunma Museum of Art, Tatebayashi
- A Blow to the Everyday / Osage Gallery, Hong Kong
- Earth: Art of a changing world / Royal Academy of Arts, London

2008

- Cape Farewell / National Museum of Emerging Science and Innovation, Tokyo
- Light InSight / NTT InterCommunication Center [ICC], Tokyo

2007

- Vom Funken zum Pixel / Martin-Gropius-Bau, Berlin

2006

- Rapt! 20 contemporary artists from Japan / Westspace, Melbourne

2005

- Conversations with Snow and Ice / The Natural History Museum of Latvia, Riga
- Rising Sun, Melting Moon / The Israel Museum, Jerusalem

2003

- Cyber Asia – media art in the near future / Hiroshima City Museum of Contemporary Art, Hiroshima
- Lille 2004 – European Capital of Culture, Lille

2001

- media messages: look thru language / Sendai mediatheque, Sendai
- AFTER-IMAGE / The National Museum of Art, Osaka

2000

- Musiques en Scène Festival / Musée d'art contemporain de Lyon
- EXIT Festival / Maison des Arts de Créteil
- VIA Festival / Le Manège - Théâtre du Manège, Maubeuge

1998

- ARTLAB 4 / Spiral Garden, Tokyo

1990

- Stadsmarkering - Groningen / Marking the City Boundaries (master plan Daniel Libeskind), Groningen

=== Public collections ===
- optical flat / fiber optic type (2000), The National Museum of Art, Osaka
- Toposcan – Ireland (2013), Tokyo Metropolitan Museum of Photography, Tokyo
- Camera Lucida (2004), Tokyo Metropolitan Museum of Photography, Tokyo

=== Tours (performances) ===
2019

- ST/LL, Leisure and Cultural Services Department, Kwai Tsing Theatre, Hong Kong
- ST/LL, Singapore International Festival of Arts

2018

- ST/LL, New National Theatre Tokyo

2017

- ST/LL, National Performing Arts Center, National Theater & Concert Hall, Taipei
- CHROMA, One Dance Week Festival, Plovdiv

2016

- ST/LL, Napoli Teatro Festival 2016 - Teatro Politeama, Naples
- CHROMA, New National Theatre Tokyo
- ST/LL, Biwako Hall - Center for the Performing Arts, Shiga

2015

- ST/LL, Halles de Schaerbeek, Brussels
- ST/LL, Le Volcan - Scène Nationale du Havre, Le Havre

2014

- CHROMA, SIAF - Sapporo International Art Festival

2013

- CHROMA, Festival de Marseille
- CHROMA concert version, SonarSound Tokyo

2012

- CHROMA, Biwako Hall - Center for the Performing Arts, Shiga
- La chambre claire, New National Theatre, Tokyo

2010

- La Càmera Lúcida, GREC Festival, Barcelone
- La chambre claire, Festival de Marseille
- La chambre claire, Biwako Hall - Center for the Performing Arts, Shiga

2009

- La Cámara Lúcida, Festival de Otoño, Madrid

2008

- Die Helle Kammer, Theater der Welt, Halle

== Discography ==
- Teiji Furuhashi + Toru Yamanaka + Dumb Type - Works Vol. 01 (Triple CD, 2005). Foil Records FR-008/3
- memorandum - Dumb Type (CD, 2000). CCI Recording CCI001
- OR - Dumb Type (CD, 1998). Foil Records DTOR
- S/N (CD, 1998). Les Disques du Soleil et de l'Acier C-DSA 54056
- Remix - Dumb Type (mini CD, 1997). Foil Records FS001
- teiji furuhashi / dumb type 1985–1994 (CD, 1996). Foil Records ML8852008
- Hotel Pro Forma, Dumb Type, Diller-Scofidio - Monkey Business Class (CD, 1996). no label. Audio document of a collaboration between Hotel Pro Forma, Dumb Type, Elizabeth Diller, Ricardo Scofidio and Willie Flindt.
- S/N - Dumb Type (CD, 1995). Newsic 30CE-N022

== Videography ==
- memorandum (DVD, 2009). Dumb Type's performance recorded in 2000. Commmons RZBM46410
- OR (DVD, 2009). Dumb Type's performance recorded in 1998. Commmons RZBM46409
- LIFE-fluid, invisible, inaudible ... (DVD, 2008). Ryuichi Sakamoto + Shiro Takatani. Commmons RZBM-46410
- OR (VHS, 1998). Dumb Type's performance recorded in 1997. Euro Space ESV-034
- pH (VHS, 1992). Dumb Type performance recorded in 1991. Euro Space ESV-033

== Awards ==
- Kyoto Prefecture Cultural Award (2019)
- "65th Prize of Fine Arts" (Art media) from the Ministry of Education of Japan (2015)
- "Merit CODAawards Winner 2015" (Institutional) for the 3D Water Matrix featuring Takatani's special artwork (2015)
- "Sole d'Ora" / TTVV Riccione (Italy) for Dumb Type video pH (1992)
- "Best Stage Recording / Studio Adaptation" / IMZ - Alter Oper, Dance Screen '92 Frankfurt (Germany) for Dumb Type video pH (1992)

== Bibliography ==
=== Books ===
- Beyond the Display, Phenomenal Art and Design in the 21st Century, Mika Iwasaka (2015). [Shiro Takatani - CHROMA, pp. 144–145, Ryuichi Sakamoto + Shiro Takatani - water state 1, pp. 174–175]. Ed. BNN, inc. ISBN 978-4-86100-951-8
- From Postwar to Postmodern, Art in Japan, 1945–1989: Primary Documents (MoMa Primary Documents), Doryun Chong, Michio Hayashi, Fumihiko Sumitomo, Kenji Kajiya (editors) (2012). The Museum of Modern Art, New York. Ed. Duke University Press Books. ISBN 978-0-8223-5368-3
- LIFE -TXT, Ryuichi Sakamoto + Shiro Takatani (2010). Ed. NTT Publishing. ISBN 978-4-7571-7042-1
- Seeing Witness: Visuality and the Ethics of Testimony, Jane Blocker (2009). [Machine Memory: Digital Witness in Dumb Type's memorandum, pp. 61–84]. Ed. The University of Minnesota Press. ISBN 978-0-8166-5477-2
- Art And Electronic Media, Edward A. Shanken (2009). [pp. 148–149]. Ed. Phaidon
- Performing Japan: Contemporary Expressions of Cultural Identity (2008). [Yuji Sone, Internalizing Digital Phenomena: The performing' body at the intersection of Japanese culture and technology, pp. 273–294]. Ed. Global Oriental. ISBN 978-1-905246-31-1
- Digital Performance: A History of New Media in Theater, Dance, Performance Art, and Installation, Steve Dixon (2007). [pp. 13, 60, 524, 661, 228–230, 547–548, 226–227, 60–61, 227–228]. Ed. The MIT Press. ISBN 978-0-262-04235-2
- Susan Sontag, Beyond the radical will (2006). [Shiro Takatani x Ryuichi Sakamoto, pp. 121–136]. Ed. Kyoto University of Art and Design + Mitsumura Suiko Shoin. ISBN 4-8381-8001-2
- Dumb Type : OR, flipbook (2004). Ed. Lille 2004 European Capital of Culture
- Anomalie_digital arts n°2 : Digital Performance (Dec 2001/Jan 2002). [Keiko Courdy, Dumb Type: Un corps interface entre signal et noise, pp. 164–181]. Ed. HYX.
- Icc Documents 1997–2000 (2001). [Dumb Type performance OR, pp. 86–95]. Ed. NTT Publishing. ISBN 978-4-7571-0049-7
- memorandum – teiji furuhashi, Dumb Type (2000). Teiji Furuhashi's texts compiled by Dumb Type. Ed. Little More. ISBN 4-89815-038-1
- Half a Century of Japanese Theater: 1990s Part 2 (2000). Ed. Kinokuniya Company Ltd. ISBN 4-314-10139-3
- Information Design, series 6 (2000). [Toru Koyamada, Dumb Type, pp. 58–69]. Ed. Kadokawa Shoten Publishing. ISBN 4-04-651406-X
- ICC Concept Book - Exploring the Future of the Imagination (1997). [Dumb Type : installation OR, pp. 84–89]. Ed. NTT Publishing Co., Ltd. ASIN: B005QCKVW4
- Annual InterCommunication '95, InterCommunication Center (1995). [Takaaki Kumakura, The Performance Art of Dumb Type, pp. 48–55, Akira Asada Dying Pictures, Loving Pictures]. Ed. NTT Publishing Co., Ltd. ASIN: B00TH6Q7HS
- Dumb Type : pHase (1993). Ed. Wacoal Art Center, Tokyo
- Stadsmarkering – Groningen, Marking the City Boundaries: The Books of Groningen, Paul Hefting and Camiel van Winkel (1990). [R: Akira Asada & Shiro Takatani, pp. 91–107]. Ed. Groningen: City Planning Department. ISBN 978-90-800606-1-6
- Plan for Sleep (1986). Cassette book. Ed. Dumb Type
- Every Dog Has his Day (1985). Cassette book. Ed. Dumb Type

=== Catalogues of exhibitions ===
- 18th Japan Media Arts Festival Award-Winning Works (2015). [Art Division - What Are Media Arts (Media Geijutsu): Shiro Takatani].
- Art robotique (2014). Artistic curator Richard Castelli. Cité des sciences et de l'industrie / Art Book Magazine. ISBN 978-2-8216-0062-1
- 17th Japan Media Arts Festival Award-Winning Works (2013). [Art Division - In Pursuit of Art Piercing the Depths of Consciousness: Shiro Takatani].
- 16th Japan Media Arts Festival Award-Winning Works (2013). [Art Division - Media Art, Inseparable from Its Epoch: Shiro Takatani].
- Camera Lucida, Takatani Shiro (2013). Tokyo Metropolitan Museum of Photography.
- Kyotographie - international photography festival (2014). [Mars, a photographic exploration, pp. 10–21]. ISBN 978-4-905333-04-3
- Kyotographie - international photography festival (2013). [pp. 48–53]. ISBN 978-4-573-03022-0
- Kichizaemon X, Raku Kichizaemon + Takatani Shiro (2012). Sagawa Art Museum.
- Art & Music – Search for New Synesthesia (2012). General Advisor Ryuichi Sakamoto, Chief Curator: Yuko Hasegawa. [Ono Seigen + Sakamoto Ryuichi + Takatani Shiro, pp. 98–101], [Sakamoto Ryuichi + Takatani Shiro, pp. 134–136]. Museum of Contemporary Art Tokyo. ISBN 978-4-8459-1207-0
- Matière-Lumière (2011). Curator Richard Castelli. [Ryuichi Sakamoto + Shiro Takatani, pp. 118–127]. Béthune 2011 Capitale Régionale de la Culture.
- Yebisu International Festival for Art & Alternative Visions 2010: Searching Songs, Keiko Okamura, Hiroko Tasaka, Masako Immaki, Jiro Iio (2010). Curator Keiko OKAMURA. Tokyo Metropolitan Museum of Photography.
- U-n-f-o-l-d: A Cultural Response to Climate Change, David Buckland, Chris Wainwright (2010). [pp. 92–95]. Springer Wien New York. ISBN 978-3-7091-0220-6
- Ecology and Art - Thinking About the Earth Through Art: From Nearby to Far Away (2009). [pp. 20–21, 37]. Gunma Museum of Art, Tatebayashi
- Vom Funken zum Pixel (2007). Curator Richard Castelli. Berliner Festspiele / Martin-Gropius-Bau Berlin. [Shiro Takatani : Camera Lucida, Chrono]. Nicolai. ISBN 978-3-89479-434-7
- Body Media (2007). Curators Richard Castelli and Gong Yan. [pp. 136–145]. O Art Center
- LIFE-fluid, invisible, inaudible ..., Sakamoto Ryuichi + Takatani Shiro (2007). NTT Publishing Co., Ltd. ISBN 978-4-7571-7036-0
- Rapt! : 20 contemporary artists from Japan (2006). Curators Yukihiro Hirayoshi, Shihoko Iida, Fumihiko Sumitomo. [Takatani Shiro in conversation with Philip Brophy, pp. 130–133, 186–189]. The Japan Foundation - Kokusai Koryu Kikin
- Conversations with Snow and Ice (2005). [p. 45]. The Natural History Museum of Latvia
- Cinémas du Futur (2004). Lille 2004 European Capital of Culture. Curator Richard Castelli. [Dumb Type: [OR] installation, pp. 28–29], [Shiro Takatani: frost frames, pp. 78–79]. Lille2004. ISBN 90-76704-61-9
- Cyber Asia – media art in the near future (2003). Hiroshima City Museum of Contemporary Art. [pp. 69–74]. ISBN 4-939105-08-3
- Dumb Type: Voyages, Minoru Hatanaka, Yukiko Shikata, Akira Asada (2002). NTT InterCommunication Center [ICC]. NTT Publishing Co. Ltd. ISBN 4-7571-7019-X
- The 1st Valencia Biennial: Communication between the Arts, Luigi Settembrini (editor) (2002). [Fujiko Nakaya + Shiro Takatani]. Charta. ISBN 978-88-8158-336-2
- Gendai: Japanese Contemporary Art - Between the Body and Space (2000). The Centre of Contemporary Art, Ujazdowski Castle, Warsaw and The Japan Foundation. [pp. 76–81]
- vision.ruhr Kunst Medien Interaktion auf der Zeche Zollern Dortmund (2000). Museen der Stadt Dortmund. [pp. 176–179]
- Stanze e segreti (2000). Skira, Geneva-Milan. [pp. 70–85]
- Musiques en Scène (2000) Musée d'Art Contemporain de Lyon. [pp. 8–15]
- Donai Yanen! Et maintenant ! La création contemporaine au Japon (1998). École nationale supérieure des Beaux-Arts, Paris. [pp. 202–207]
- Japanese Art After 1945: Scream Against the Sky (1994). Curator Alexandra Munroe. The Guggenheim Museum and San Francisco Museum of Modern Art and The Japan Foundation. Harry N. Abrams, Inc. [pp. 305, 343, 358–359, 404]
- Japanese Art After 1945: Scream Against the Sky (1994). Curator Alexandra Munroe. Yokohama Museum of Art. [p. 184]
- Binaera: 14 Interaktionen - Kunst und Technologie (1993), Kunsthalle Wien, [Dumb Type, pp. 57–65, 160–163]
- Dumb Type : pH catalogue (1993). Wacoal Art Center, Tokyo
- L'ère binaire : nouvelles interactions - Musée communal d'Ixelles, Charles Hirsch, Michel Baudson et Ludion (1992), Brussels. [Dumb Type by Barbara London, pp. 57–65, 160–163]. Ludion
- Mito Annual '93 Another World (1992). Art Tower Mito Contemporary Art Gallery [Dumb Type, pp. 86–89], [Yuko Hasegawa, Dumb Type, pp. 117–119]. ISBN 4-943825-12-5
- Zones of Love — Contemporary Art From Japan (1991). Museum of Contemporary Art, Sydney. [pp. 58–61]
- European Media Art Festival Osnabrück (1990) [Playback: a documentary of the performance Pleasure Life, p. 72]
- pH Catalogue. 1990. Wacoal Art Center.
- Against Nature: Japanese Art in the Eighties (1989). Grey Art Gallery & Study Center, New York University, the MIT List Visual Arts Center and The Japan Foundation. [pp. 50–51, 78, 85]

=== Essays / Art Press ===
- Shiro Takatani. The extension of visible: shapes of time, acoustic images & chromatic figures. Enrico Pitozzi. Digimag #82, (September 2013).
- BT: Monthly Art Magazine Bijutsu Techo - No. 886 (September 2006). [Shiro Takatani]. Bijutsu Shuppan Sha, Tokyo. ISSN 0287-2218
- Stadmenschen in Medienlandschaften. Eiichiro Hirata. Theater der Zeit, Nr.9. (September 2006). [pp. 13–14]
- BT: Monthly Art Magazine Bijutsu Techo - No. 849 (May 2004). [Dumb Type, Takayuki Fujimoto, Teiji Furuhashi, Ryoji Ikeda, Toru Koyamada, Shiro Takatani]. Bijutsu Shuppan Sha, Tokyo. ISSN 0287-2218
- Meditations on Space and Time: The Performance Art of Japan's Dumb Type. Dorinda Neave. Art Journal, Vol. 60 (Spring 2001). [pp. 84–93]
- Diatxt. 01 (2000). [Shiro Takatani, Dumb type]. Kyoto Art Center, Kyoto.
- Dumb Type, Landmark Hall, Yokohama. Judy Annear. ART + TEXT, Number 51 (1995). [p. 73]

=== Audio / visual Documentaries ===
- Shiro Takatani, between nature and technology (2019). A 52-minute documentary film directed by Giulio Boato, in Japanese, French, English, with French subtitles, including interviews with Shiro Takatani, Ryuichi Sakamoto, Ryoji Ikeda, Simon Fisher Turner. Production: Idéale Audience. World premiere at the FIFA competition - International Festival of Films on Art in Montreal.
- Event Documentation by AAA Hong Kong Staff: October 2009 (2009). Asia Art Archive, Hong Kong.
- Musiques en scène, Trans/Formes (2000), radio documentary by Alexandre Castant. With James Giroudon, Pierre Alain Jaffrennou, Ulf Langheinrich (Granular-Synthesis), Micha Laury, Thierry Raspail, Shiro Takatani (Dumb Type). France Culture, Paris, 30 min.
- Arte Video Night 2009. Thème 5 : Entendre. Memorandum by Dumb Type
- Cycle création contemporaine au Japon : Dumb Type (DVD, 1998), documentary by Gilles Coudert (16 min. / Japanese version with French/English subtitles). Copyright: Triac documentaire, cop. 1998. Arte / Metropolis. apres production, collection Kaleidoscope (2008)
