= Kurt Hentschlager =

Austrian artist

Kurt Hentschlager, or Hentschläger (born in Linz, Austria, in 1960) is a New York-based Austrian artist who creates audiovisual installations and performances. Between 1992 and 2003, he worked in a duo called Granular-Synthesis.

== Education and early career ==
From 1982 to 1985, Hentschlager studied at the University of Applied Arts in Vienna under Peter Weibel. He began to exhibit his work in 1983, building surreal machines and then video, computer animation, and sound works. In the early stages of his career, he also worked under the name Kurt Kitzler.

== Granular-Synthesis ==
In 1991 in Vienna, Hentschlager and German artist Ulf Langheinrich co-founded the duo Granular-Synthesis. The name refers to the technique of granular synthesis, which Hentschlager and Langheinrich applied to both sound and image. Their multimedia installations and performances included Modell 5 (1994), Areal (1997), Noisegate (1998) and Pol (1998). They toured worldwide, and several compilations of their works were released on DVD. They won the International Biennial competition in Nagoya, Japan, in 1995, as well as stipends in Austria and the United States.

== Themes ==
Hentschlager has described his installations as "visceral and immersive". A recurring topic in his work is the human body; human expression; the way the brain processes the outside world; and how perception is colored by imagination and one's individual psychology. Toward this end, he follows research in psychology and neurology as well as in contemporary art and culture. His current work focuses on nature and artifice from a post-utopian, post-science-fiction perspective.

== Exhibitions and awards ==
Hentschlager's works have been exhibited at the Stedelijk Museum Amsterdam; Art Basel in Basel, Hong Kong, and Miami Beach; the National Art Museum of China in Beijing; Halle am Berghain in Berlin; the STRP Festival in Eindhoven; the Museum of Old and New Art in Hobart, Australia; the Borusan Music House in Istanbul; the Center for Art and Media Karlsruhe; Lille 2004 - European Capital of Culture; the Laboratoria Arte Alameda in Mexico City; the Musée d'art contemporain de Montreal; Elektra Festival and the SAT - Society for Arts and Technology Montreal; the MoMA PS1 New York; the Wood Street Galleries in Pittsburgh, the Romaeuropa Festival in Rome; the National Museum of Modern and Contemporary Art in Seoul; O Art Centre - Sculpture Art Centre and Power Station of Art in Shanghai; Sharjah Art Foundation; the NTT InterCommunication Center in Tokyo; the Venice Biennale and Biennale Teatro Venice; the Museum of Applied Arts Vienna; Wien Modern and Wiener Festwochen in Vienna. He was also an exhibiting artist at Eyebeam New York in 2005 and a full-time visiting artist at the School of the Art Institute of Chicago. from 2013 to 2018.

He has received many awards and commissions, including the Qwartz New Media Art Award in 2010 in Paris, the File Prix Lux in São Paulo, the Austrian Federal State Grant for Media Art, and the Chicago Studio Grant. In 2012, he was commissioned as part of the 2012 Cultural Olympiad to create Core, a symphonic installation.

== Books ==
The first artist monograph edited by Isabelle Meiffert, was published in two volumes in 2017 by Distanz Verlag, Germany.

Released in January 2017 on the occasion of the premiere of Hentschlager installation SOL in Berlin, Splendid Voids—The Immersive Works of Kurt Hentschläger (ISBN 978-3-95476-183-8) was devoted to the artist's immersive installations and included an essay by the American art critic G. Roger Denson. The second volume, Rendered Real - The Mediated Landscapes of Kurt Hentschläger (ISBN 978-3-95476-217-0) released later in October 2017 featured the artist's video pieces including his latest work ORT, introduced in the book by Daniel Rourke.
