= Wels =

City in Upper Austria, Austria

Wels Wös
- Statutory city
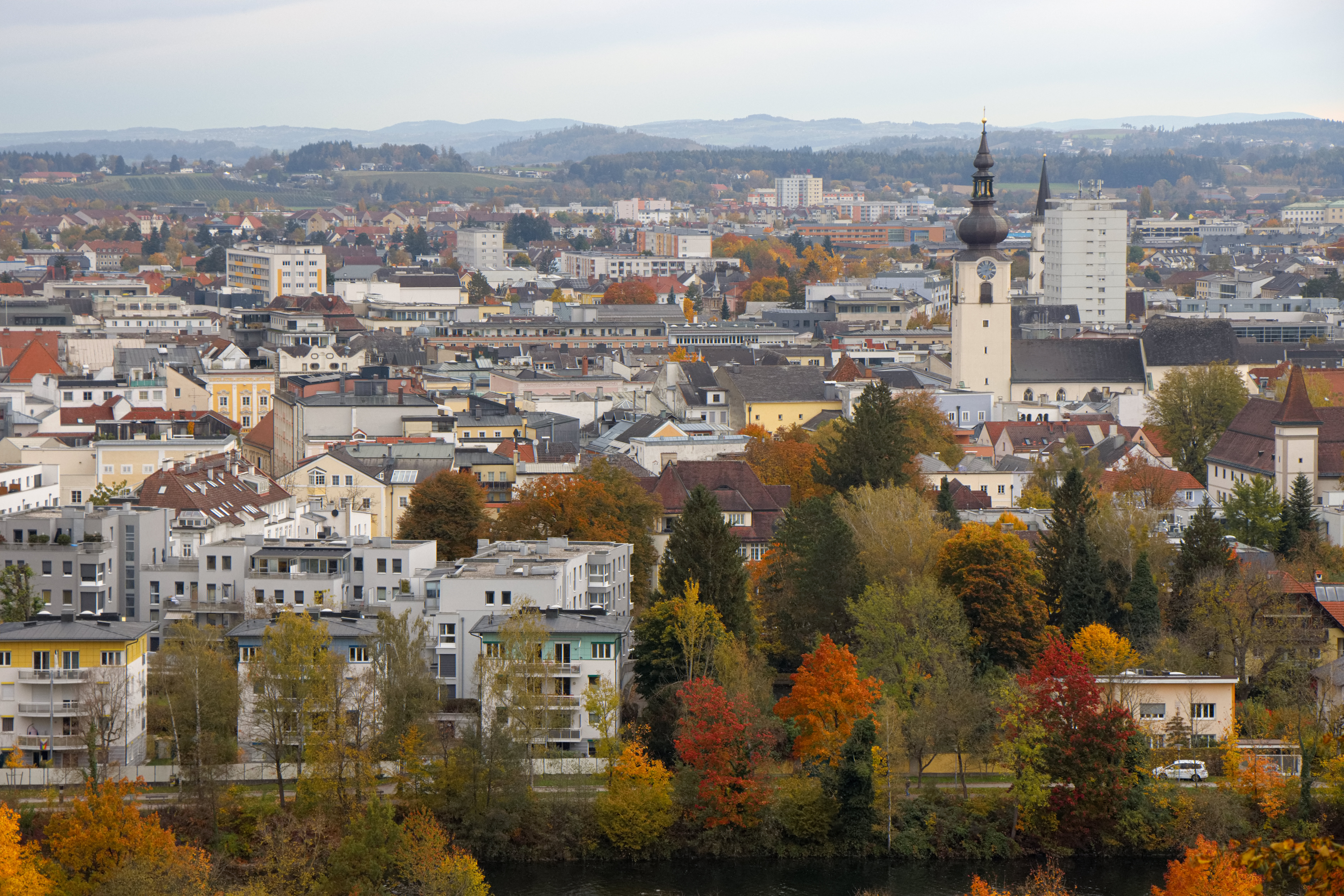
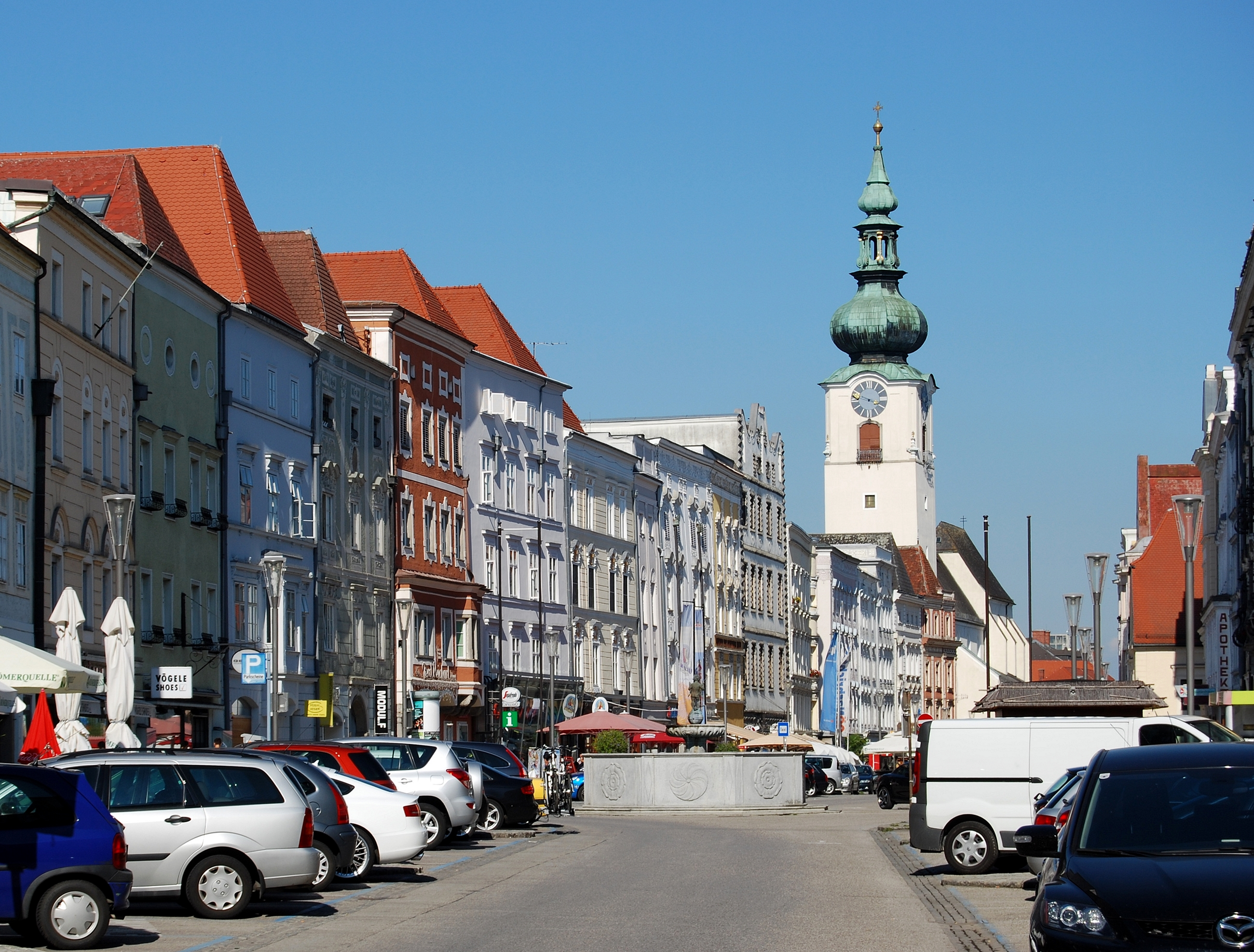
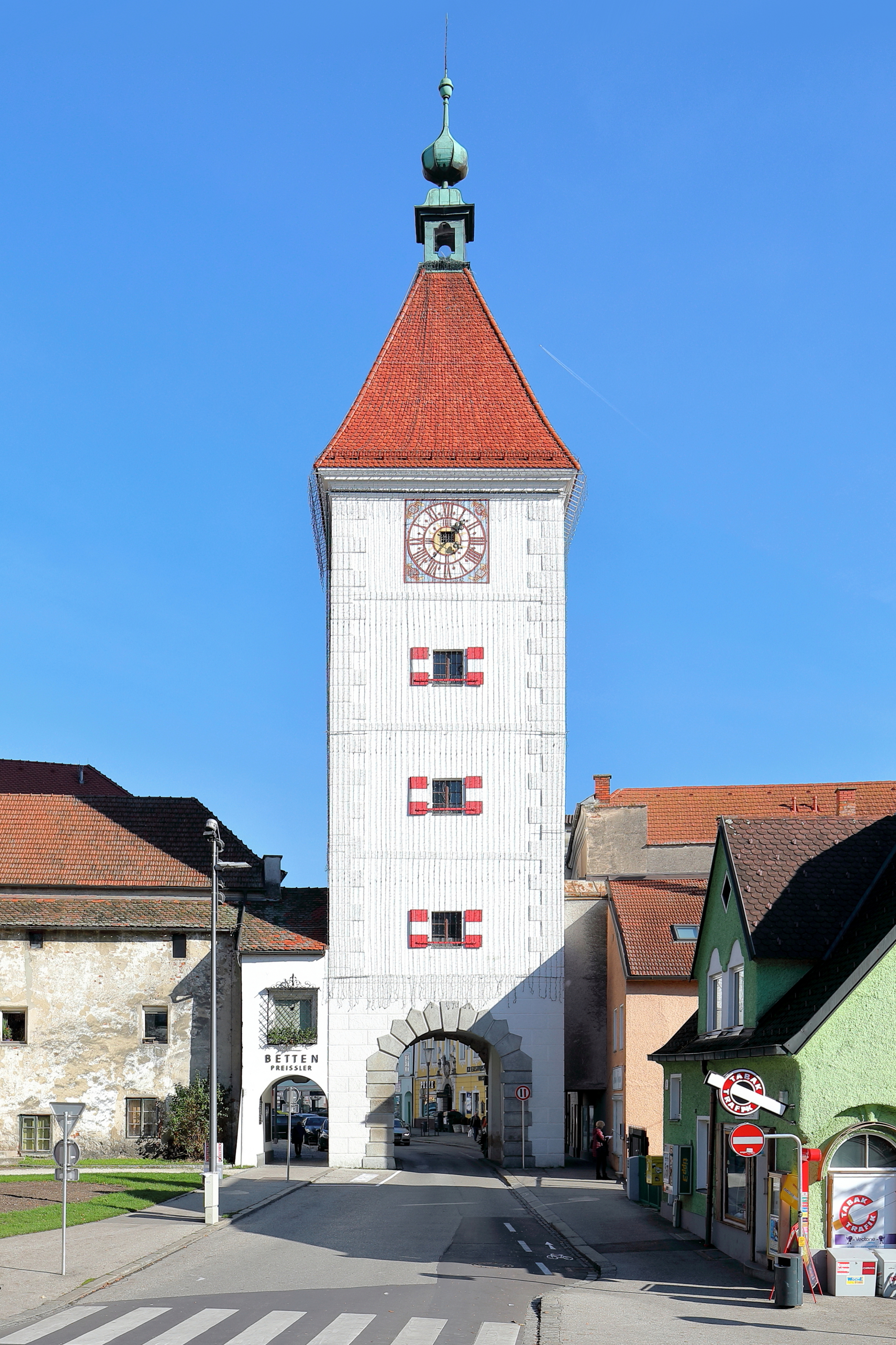
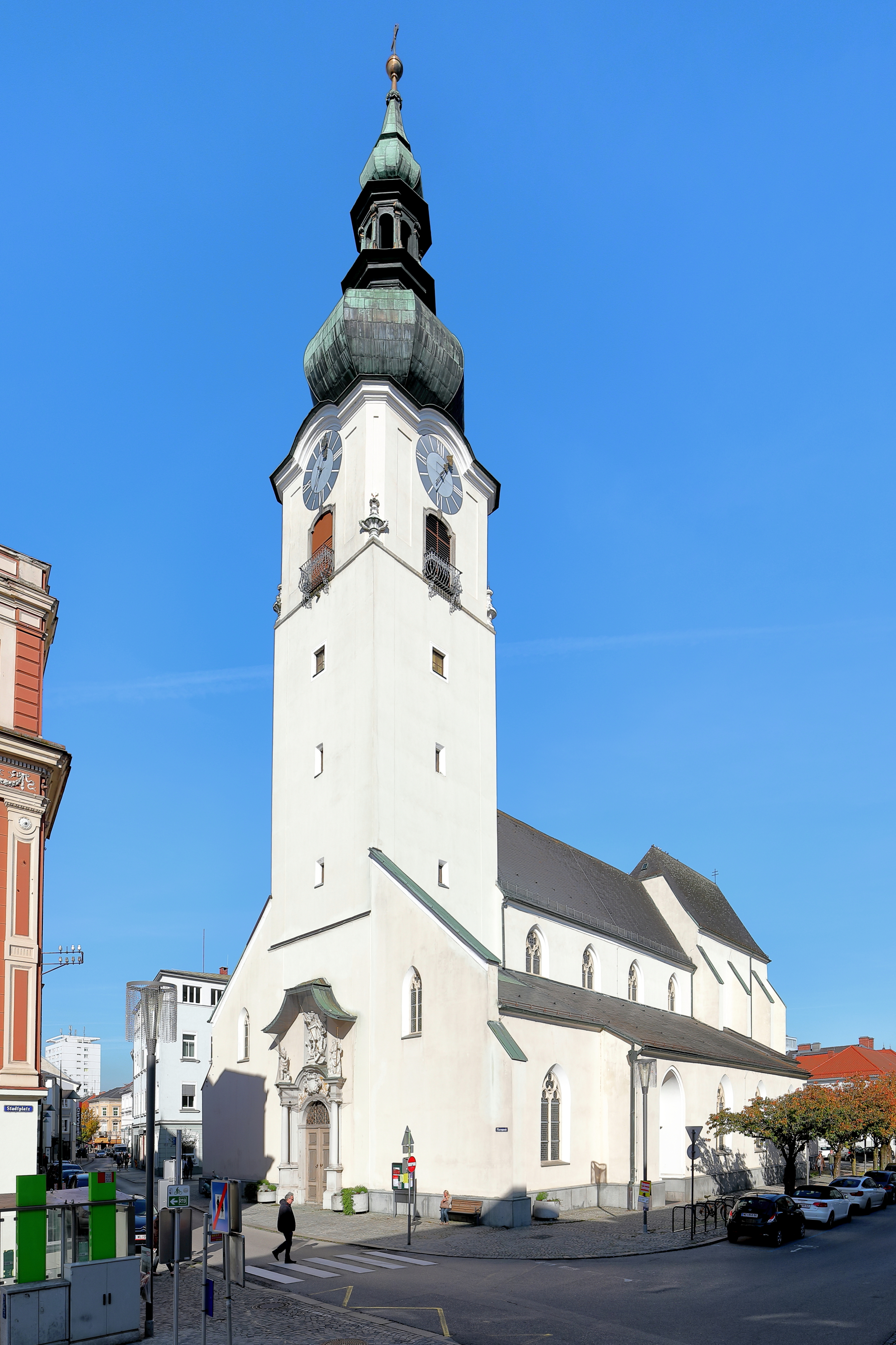
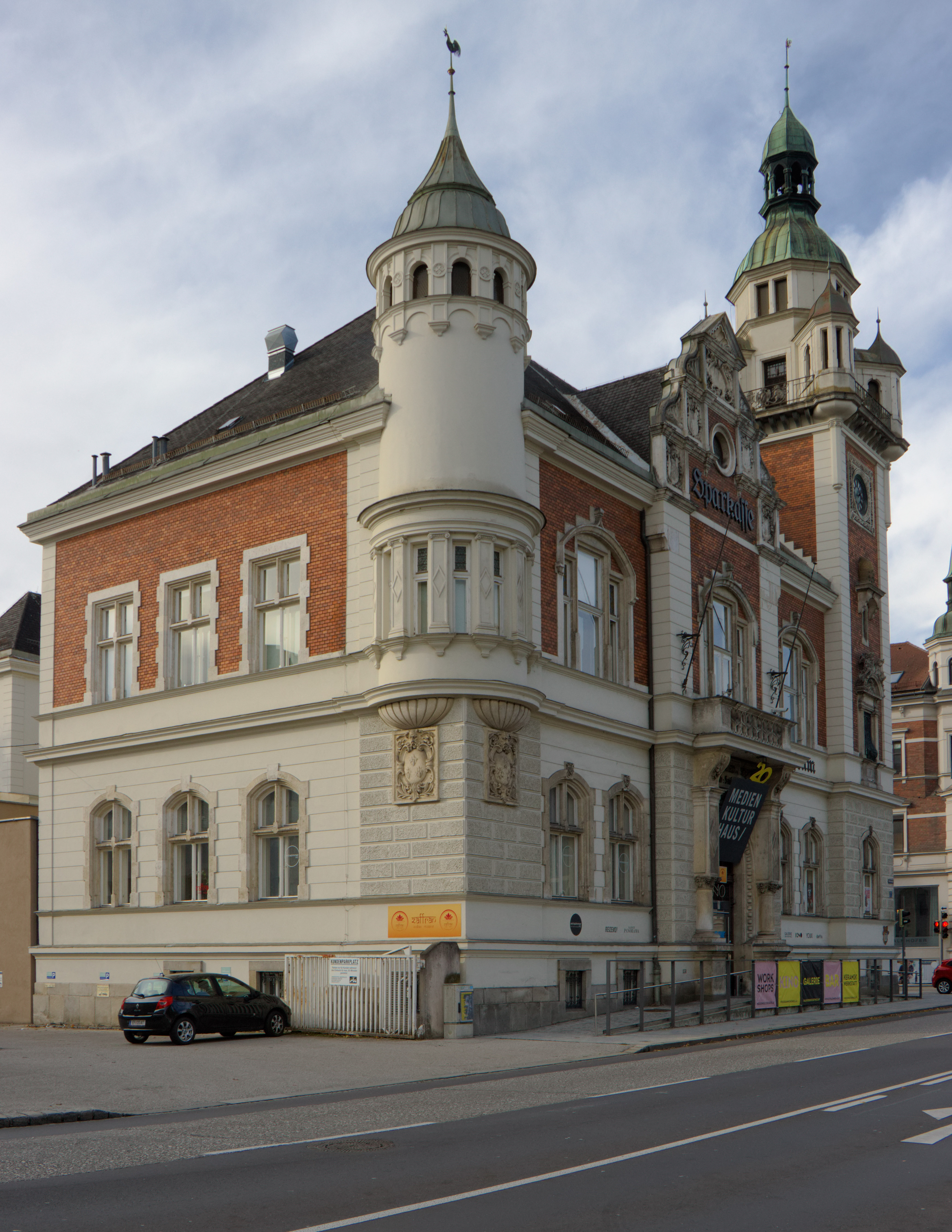
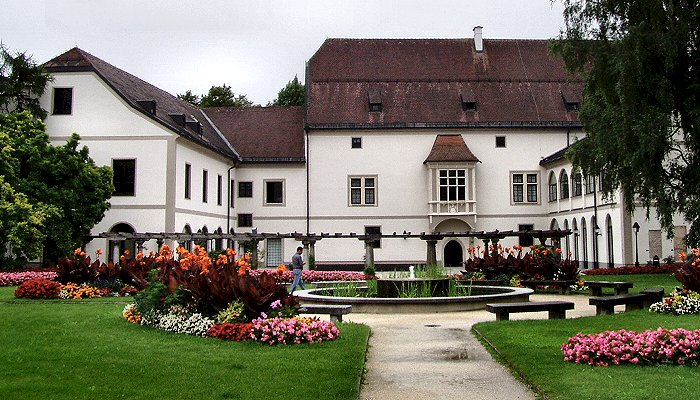
- From top down, left to right: view of Wels from Thalheim, Stadtplatz in the city center, Ledererturm, city parish church, former savings bank, Burg Wels

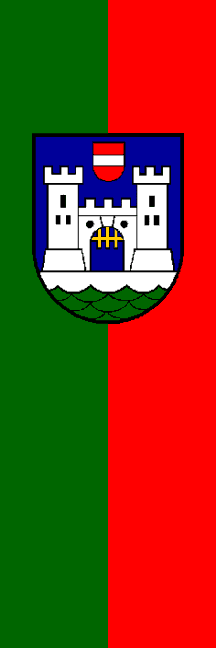
- Flag Coat of arms

- Location within Austria Wels (Austria)
- Coordinates: 48°09′0″N 14°01′0″E
- Country: Austria
- State: Upper Austria
- District: Statutory city

Government
  - Mayor: Dr. Andreas Rabl (FPÖ)

Area
  - Statutory city: 45.92 km^{2} (17.73 sq mi)
- Elevation: 317 m (1,040 ft)

Population (2018-01-01)
  - Statutory city: 61,233
  - Density: 1,333/km^{2} (3,454/sq mi)
  - Metro: 88,577
- Time zone: UTC+1 (CET)
  - Summer (DST): UTC+2 (CEST)
- Postal code: 4600–4606
- Area code: 07242
- Vehicle registration: WE
- Website: www.wels.at

Wels (German pronunciation: [vɛls]; Central Bavarian: Wös) is a city in Upper Austria, on the Traun River near Linz. It is the county seat of Wels-Land, and with a population of 65,482 (January 2025), the eighth largest city in Austria.

== Geography ==
Wels is in the Hausruckviertel at an elevation of 317 metres (1,040 ft). From north to south, it extends over 9.5 kilometres (5.9 mi), from west to east over 9.6 kilometres (6.0 mi). 3.4% of the area is covered with forest, 23.5% is used for agriculture.

The town comprises the following boroughs: Aichberg, Au, Berg, Brandln, Dickerldorf, Doppelgraben, Eben, Gaßl, Höllwiesen, Hölzl, Kirchham, Laahen, Lichtenegg, Mitterlaab, Nöham, Niederthan, Oberhaid, Oberhart, Oberlaab, Oberthan, Pernau, Puchberg, Roithen, Rosenau, Schafwiesen, Stadlhof, Trausenegg, Unterleithen, Waidhausen, Wels, Wimpassing, Wispl.

== History ==
=== Prehistoric ===
The area of Wels has been settled since the Neolithic era (between 3500 and 1700 B.C.E.), as evidenced by archaeological finds of simple tools, especially from around the banks of the Traun River in what is now the city center.

A Bronze Age (after 1700 B.C.E.) cemetery was found in the area of the current airport and dated to the time of the Urnfield Culture (1100–750 B.C.E.). It contained 60 graves with such items as bronze jewelry and food.

Swords from the Hallstatt Period (750–400 B.C.E.) have been found in the area of Pernau.

During the Iron Age La Tène Culture (up to 100 B.C.E.) Celts inhabited the area, leaving behind gold coins, swords, earthenware and iron brooches. The name "Traun" comes from this time, and it is possible that "Wels" is similarly of Celtic origin. The name "Wels" could be Celtic for "Settlement on the bend of the Traun River".

=== Roman Era ===
Wels gained importance in Roman times because of its central location in the province of Noricum. Around the year 120, Wels received Roman city rights under the name of Municipium Ovilava. The enclosed built-up area by the Traun River was at the present level of Kaiser-Josef-Platz. There were brick houses, a bath, an arena and an irrigation system of pure mountain water brought from beyond the Traun.

Around 215, during the reign of Emperor Caracalla, it was renamed Colonia Aurelia Antoniana Ovilabis and given Colonia status. At this time, the city had around 18,000 inhabitants.

Due to the impending threat of the Alemanni, the city was surrounded by a city wall that enclosed an area of about 90 hectares and a road was built along the Danube to Passau. It is known that six towers with gates were integrated into the walls, controlling entrances from along the western road, towards the Traun, and to the fields beyond the city.

As part of his reforms Emperor Diocletian made Ovilava the capital city of the province of Noricum Ripensis. It was governed by two duumviri who served as municipal judges, two aediles, who advocated compliance with the laws and market rights, a quaestor, who managed the city treasury, and a 100-member city council.

Ovilava administered an area enclosed by the Inn and Danube, from Lauriacum (Enns) in the east to submitted to Bad Ischl in the west. In this area are included the border fortifications, Linz (Lentia) and Passau (Boiodurum), as well as numerous settlements in what are now the regions of Upper Austria and Salzburg.

During the early migration period (3rd, 4th and 5th century), the area around Ovilava was often invaded by the Alamanni, Vandals and other Germanic tribes as well as by Attila's army. During the time of the Emperor Gallienus the province of Noricum was described as "devastated". By the time of Odoacer, the first Germanic King of Italy, Noricum was described as "vacant". From the 4th century onward, it is likely that Wels was again a small and insignificant village for several centuries.

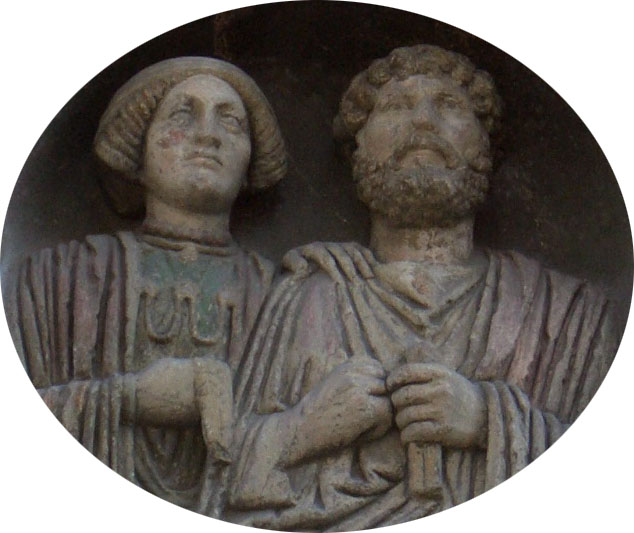
A medallion from a Roman grave reused in a house in Wels

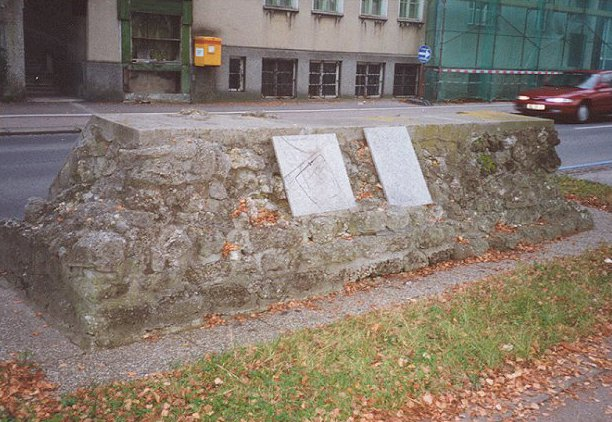
Remnant of the Roman walls of Wels, Schubertstrasse

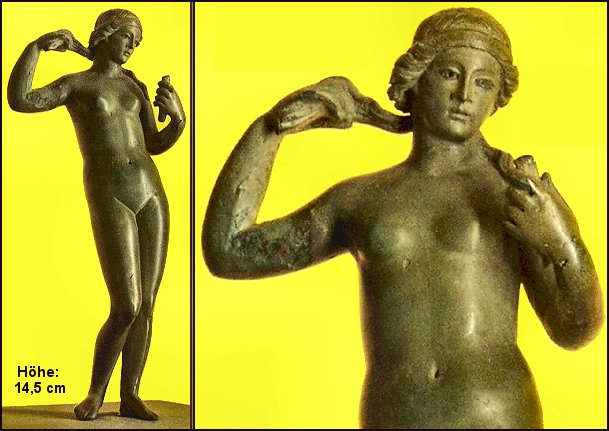
The "Venus of Wels"

==== The economy of Roman Wels ====
Agriculture and regional trade formed the basis for the economy of Ovilava. While most agriculture was subsistence level, cows and horses were produced in large enough numbers to be exported. The oldest granary in the Eastern Alps has been discovered in Wels, which housed diverse grains such as wheat, dwarf wheat, emmer wheat, barley and rye. There were additionally significant brick and pottery works as well as mines for construction stone.

Due to its situation at an important crossing of several Roman roads, both east-to-west and to the south, archeology reveals a large number of objects manufactured in other areas of the empire, such as Terra Sigillata pottery and statuettes (such as the "Venus of Wels") from Gaul and Germania Inferior, as well as oyster shells and coins from Italy.

=== Middle Ages ===
Wels served as a minor trading centre during the Middle Ages. In 943, the Hungarians were defeated by the Bavarians and Carantanians at the Battle of Wels. In 1222, during the rule of the Babenberger family, Wels again received city rights. A document dating to 1328 provides evidence for Wels' important role as the location of a market. Its endowment with economic privileges, and its advantageous position on several rivers allowed it to gain an important position in the region.

Emperor Maximilian I died in Wels on January 12, 1519, after having been denied access to Innsbruck by its citizens.

=== 20th century ===
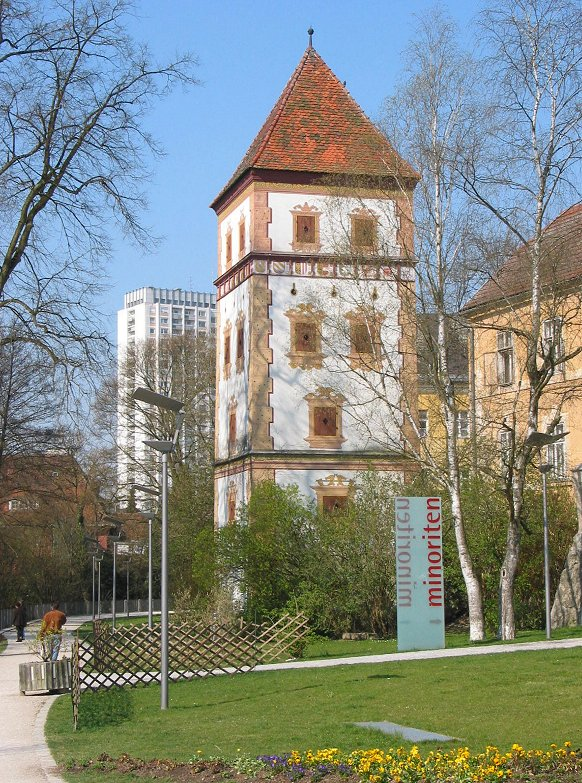
Water tower Wels

During World War II, a subcamp of Mauthausen concentration camp was located here.

On 18 January 1964, Wels became a Statutarstadt of Austria.

== Demographics ==
Historical population
| Year | Pop. | ±% |
|---|---|---|
| 1869 | 11,704 | — |
| 1880 | 13,175 | +12.6% |
| 1890 | 14,735 | +11.8% |
| 1900 | 17,308 | +17.5% |
| 1910 | 22,015 | +27.2% |
| 1923 | 24,248 | +10.1% |
| 1934 | 25,956 | +7.0% |
| 1939 | 29,533 | +13.8% |
| 1951 | 38,120 | +29.1% |
| 1961 | 41,060 | +7.7% |
| 1971 | 47,527 | +15.8% |
| 1981 | 51,060 | +7.4% |
| 1991 | 52,478 | +2.8% |
| 2001 | 55,478 | +5.7% |
| 2011 | 58,713 | +5.8% |
| 2021 | 62,654 | +6.7% |
| 2025 | 65,482 | +4.5% |

Largest groups of foreign residents
| Nationality | Population (2026) |
|---|---|
| Croatia | 3,298 |
| Bosnia and Herzegovina | 2,692 |
| Romania | 1,863 |
| Turkey | 1,735 |
| Serbia | 1,724 |
| Hungary | 1,748 |
| North Macedonia | 1,564 |
| Germany | 936 |
| Afghanistan | 892 |
| Kosovo | 691 |
| Syria | 666 |
| Slovenia | 599 |
| Ukraine | 578 |
| Bulgaria | 364 |
| Slovakia | 365 |
| Italy | 273 |
| Russian Federation | 271 |
| Poland | 247 |
| Iraq | 236 |
| Iran | 103 |
| Czech Republic | 99 |

== Politics ==
The municipal council (Gemeinderat) consists of 36 members. Following the 2021 Upper Austrian Local Elections, the seat distribution is as follows:

- Freedom Party of Austria (FPÖ): 17 seats
- Social Democratic Party of Austria (SPÖ): 9 seats
- Austrian People's Party (ÖVP): 4 seats
- The Greens - The Green Alternative (GRÜNE): 4 seats
- NEOS - The New Austria (NEOS): 1 seat
- People - Freedom - Fundamental Rights (MFG): 1 seat

The mayor of Wels, Andreas Rabl (FPÖ), was re-elected in 2021.

== Economy ==
There are about 36,000 people employed in Wels. Of that, about 63% are in the service sector. Wels is known as an important city for shopping and the location of several gymnasiums (academic secondary schools) and higher vocational schools and also of a vocational college. Furthermore, it is famous for the Wels Fair, which takes place every year in autumn and spring.

== Notable residents ==
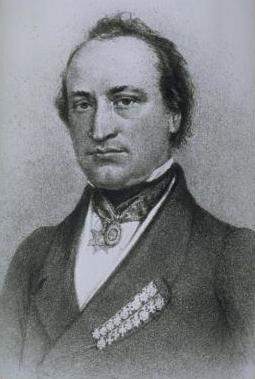
Alois Auer

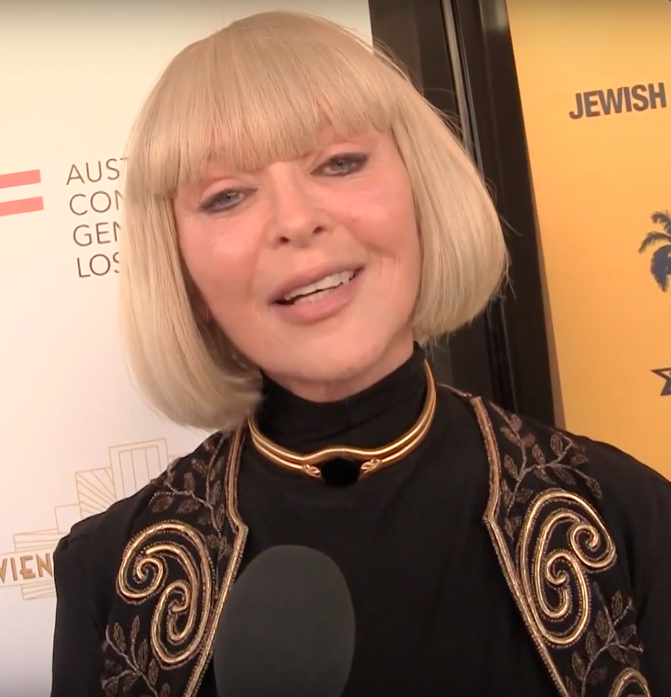
Sybil Danning, 2018

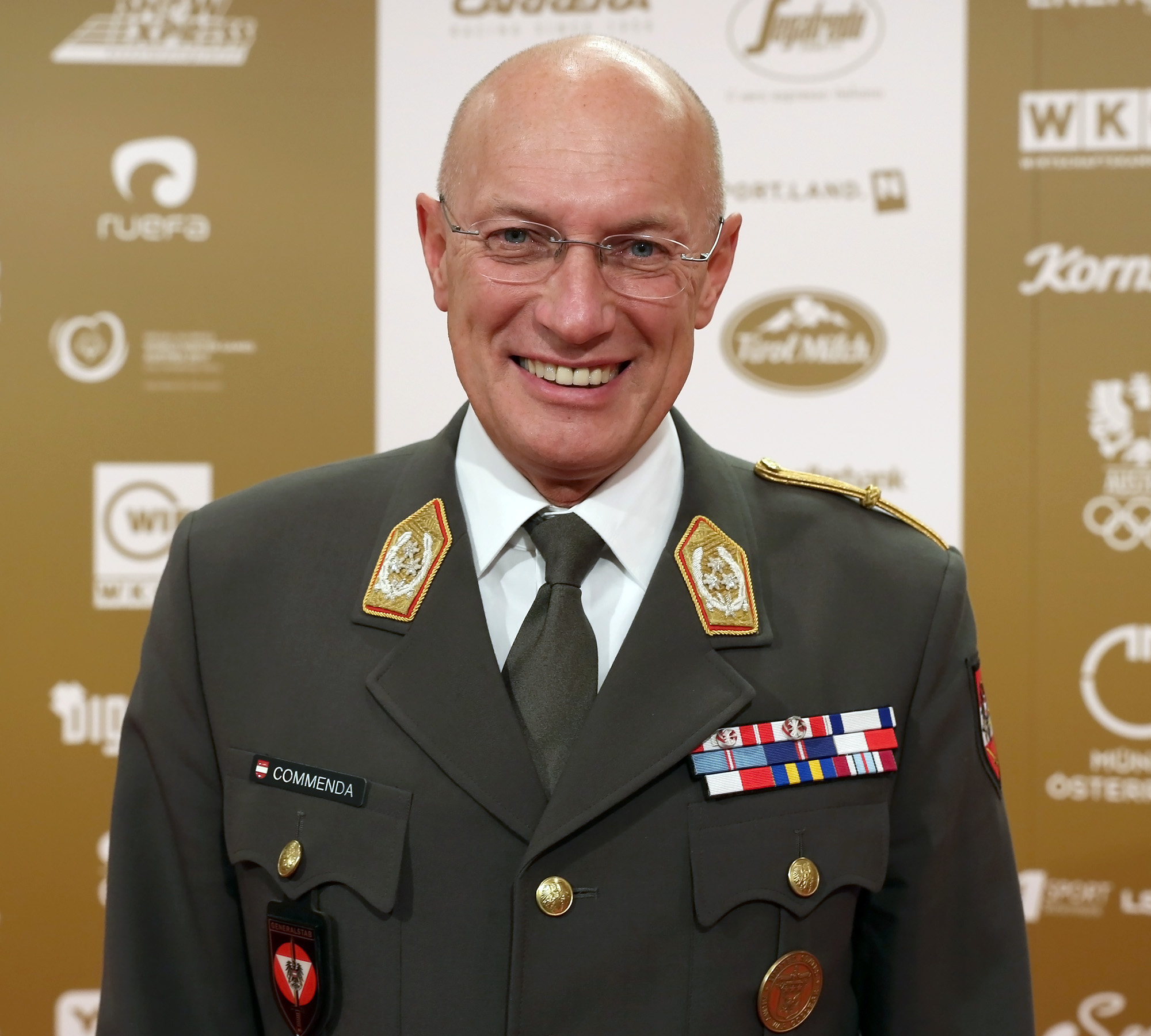
Othmar Commenda, 2013

- Alois Auer (1813–1869), printer, inventor and botanical illustrator
- Heinrich Brunner (1840–1915), historian
- Hugo Gerard Ströhl (1851–1919), heraldist
- Carl Rabl (1853–1917), physician and anatomist
- Julius Wagner-Jauregg (1857–1940), physician, winner of Nobel Prize in Physiology or Medicine in 1927
- Grete Hinterhofer (1899–1985), classical pianist and composer
- Walter Kolneder (1910–1994), musicologist and violist
- Josef Friedrich Doppelbauer (1918–1989), composer, organist and choral conductor
- Thomas Christian David (1925–2006), composer and performer
- Werner Kreindl (1927–1992), television actor
- Karl Ridderbusch (1932–1997), operatic bass, lived and died locally
- Herbert Lindinger (born 1933), graphic artist, exhibition & industrial designer; designs trains and trams
- Lukas David (1934–2021), classical violinist
- Karin Hannak (born 1940), artist
- Sybil Danning (born 1947), an Austrian–American actress, model, and film producer
- Manfred Buchroithner (born 1950), cartographer, geologist and professor
- Paul Rübig (born 1953), politician (ÖVP), member of the European Parliament
- Christoph Ransmayr (born 1954), writer
- Othmar Commenda (born 1954), retired General of the Austrian Armed Forces worked locally
- Thomas Steiner (born 1956), film director
- Franz Welser-Möst (born 1960), conductor, grew up locally
- Rudolf Anschober (born 1960), Austrian politician
- Stefan Sonvilla-Weiss (born 1961), communication scientist and arts and media educator
- Götz Spielmann (born 1961), film director and screenwriter
- Sabine Derflinger (born 1963), director, writer, producer and dramaturgical consultant
- Norbert Trawöger (born 1971), flautist and artistic director
- Christoph Wigelbeyer (born 1973), choir director, conductor, singer and music educator

=== Sport ===
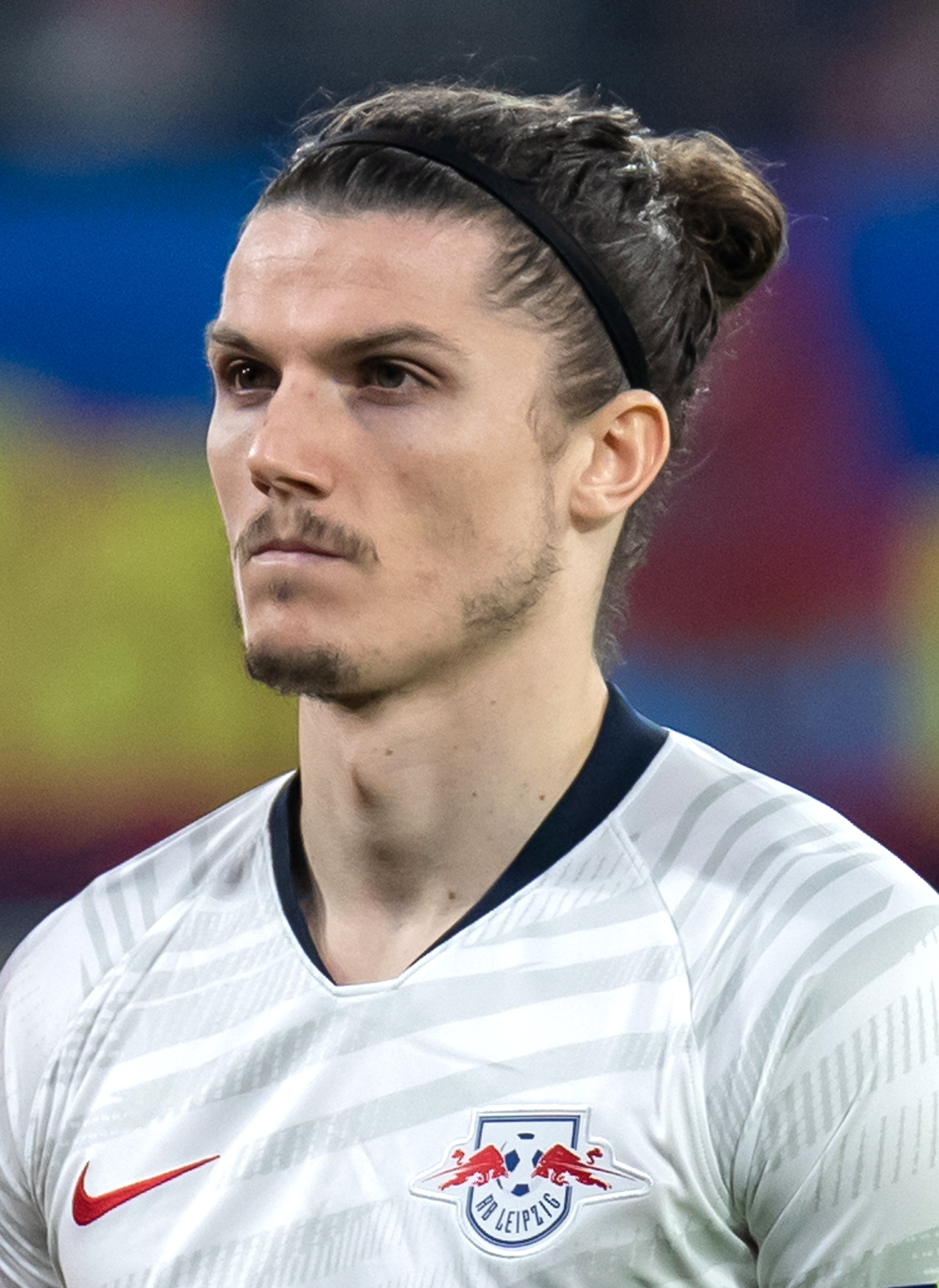
Marcel Sabitzer, 2020

- Max Hagmayr (born 1956), retired footballer, played 286 games and 9 for Austria
- Horst Felbermayr Jr. (born 1970), racing driver
- Christoph Sieber (born 1971), sailor, gold medallist in the Mistral class at the 2000 Summer Olympics
- Christian Mayrleb (born 1972), footballer, top scorer in the top division; played 584 games and 30 for Austria
- Johannes Wipplinger (born 1978), athlete and bobsledder
- Helge Payer (born 1979), football goalkeeper, played 271 games and 20 for Austria
- Kevin Wimmer (born 1992), football player, played 220 games and 9 for Austria
- Felix Großschartner (born 1993), cyclist
- Robert Žulj (born 1992), footballer, played over 300 games
- Peter Žulj (born 1993), footballer, played over 300 games and 11 for Austria
- Marcel Sabitzer (born 1994), footballer, played 370 games and 77 for Austria
- Shamil Borchashvili (born 1995), Austrian judoka; bronze meadllist at the 2020 Summer Olympics
- Emma Felbermayr (born 2007), racing driver
- Ermin Mahmić (born 2005), footballer, top goal scorer for Bosnia and Herzegovina at the 2026 FIFA World Cup

== See also ==
- FC Wels
- Wels Airport
- Trodat
- TGW Logistics Group
- Wels-Land
