= Scenario (artwork) =

Scenario is an artificial intelligence (AI) computer graphic interactive installation, directed by the artist Dennis Del Favero, and developed in collaboration with scriptwriter Stephen Sewell, AI scientist Maurice Pagnucco working with computer scientists Anuraag Sridhar, Arcot Sowmya and Paul Compton. It is a 360-degree 3D cinematic work whose narrative is interactively produced by the audience and humanoid characters. The title is a Commedia dell'arte term (Italian pronunciation: [ʃeˈnaːrjo]) referring to the way dramatic action is dependent on the way actors and audience interact. Scenario was developed at the iCinema Centre for Interactive Cinema Research.

== Description ==
Scenario is inspired by the experimental television work of Samuel Beckett. It is set within a concealed labyrinth where five humanoid characters have been imprisoned. The characters take the audience through the labyrinth in an attempt to discover the possible ways they and the audience can resolve the mystery of their imprisonment and so effect an escape. Watching them are a series of shadowy humanoid sentinels who track these humanoids and the audience, physically trying to block their escape.

By rapidly interpreting and responding to audience behaviour by means of a sophisticated AI system, the humanoid sentinels work effortlessly to try and inhibit the audience at every turn. This two-fold dramatic action enables the work to create a narrative that evolves according to how the humanoids and the audience physically interact with each other. This is effected by means of a vision system that tracks the audience's behaviour, linked to an AI system that allows the humanoids to independently interpret and respond to audience behaviour.

=== Scenario's AI system ===
The AI system is based on a variant of a symbolic logic planner drawn from the cognitive robotics language Golog developed at the University of Toronto, capable of dealing with sensors and external actions. Animations that can be performed by a humanoid character are considered actions that need to be modeled and controlled (e.g., walking to a location, pushing a character, etc.). Each action is modeled in terms of the conditions under which it can be performed (e.g., you can push a character if you are located next to it) and how it affects the environment when the action is performed. Using this modeling, the AI system plans or coordinates the actions (i.e., animations) of the humanoid characters by reasoning about the most appropriate course of action. A custom 3D behaviour toolset allows the creation of 'scenarios' that exhibit a cycle of cause and effect between the real world and the digital world. Its principal feature is that it allows the cognitive robotic language to implement realistic behaviour in the humanoid characters with a minimum of programming effort.

=== Scenario's environment: AVIE ===
Scenario takes place within iCinema's Advanced Visualisation and Interaction Environment (AVIE), which consists of a 360 degree stereoscopic immersive interactive visualisation environment with motion and shape tracking systems and a multi-channel audio system. Measuring four meters high and ten meters in diameter, it is a set of state-of-the-art resources that enables the development and study of applications in the fields of immersive visualisation, interactive narrative, and human interaction design. It is located in iCinema's Scientia Facility.

== See also ==
- Dennis Del Favero
- New media
- New media art
- Digital media
