= Peter Weibel =

Austrian artist (1944–2023)

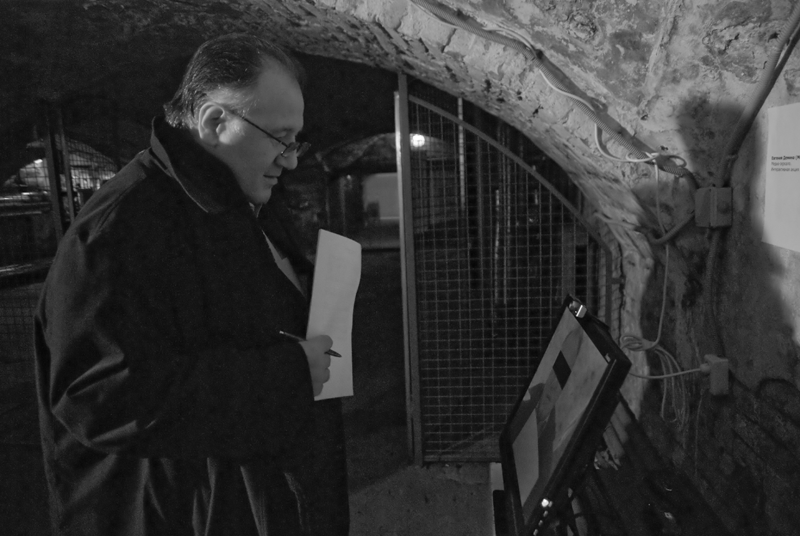
- Born: 5 March 1944; Odesa, Ukrainian SSR, USSR
- Died: 1 March 2023 (aged 78); Karlsruhe, Baden-Württemberg, Germany
- Occupations: Artist, curator, theoretician

Peter Weibel (Austrian German: [ˈvaɪbl], German: [ˈvaɪbəl]; 5 March 1944 – 1 March 2023) was an Austrian post-conceptual artist, curator, and new media theoretician. He started out in 1964 as a visual poet, then later moved from the page to the screen within the sense of post-structuralist methodology. His work includes virtual reality and other digital art forms. From 1999 he was the director of the ZKM Center for Art and Media Karlsruhe.

== Biography ==
Weibel was born in Odesa, USSR on 5 March 1944. He was raised in Ried, Upper Austria, and studied French and cinematography in Paris. In 1964 he began to study medicine in Vienna, but changed soon to mathematics, with an emphasis on logic.

Weibel's work was in conceptual art, performance, experimental film, video art, and computer art.

Beginning in 1965 from semiotic and linguistic reflections (Austin, Jakobson, Peirce, Wittgenstein), Weibel developed an artistic language, which led him from experimental literature to performance. In his performative actions, he explored not only the "media" language and body, but also film, video, television, audiotape and interactive electronic environments. Critically he analyzed their function for the construction of reality. Besides taking part in happenings with members of the Vienna Actionism, he developed from 1967 (together with Valie Export, Ernst Schmidt Jr. and Hans Scheugl) an "expanded cinema" inspired by the American one and reflects the ideological and technological conditions of cinematic representation. Weibel elaborated on these reflections, from 1969, in his video tapes and installations. With his television action "tv und vt works", which was broadcast by the Austrian Television (ORF) in 1972, he transcended the borders of the gallery space and queried video technology in its application as a mass medium. In 1966 he was with Gustav Metzger, Otto Muehl, Wolf Vostell, Hermann Nitsch and others a participant of the Destruction in Art Symposium (DIAS) in London.

Weibel worked using a variety of materials, forms and techniques: text, sculpture, installation, film and video. In 1978 he turned to music. Together with Loys Egg, he founded the band "Hotel Morphila Orchester" (orchestra). In the mid-1980s, he explored the possibilities of computer-aided video processing. Beginning of the 1990s he realized interactive computer-based installations.

In his lectures and articles, Weibel commented on contemporary art, media history, media theory, film, video art and philosophy. As theoretician and curator, he pleaded for a form of art and art history that includes history of technology and history of science. In his function as a university professor and director of institutions like the Ars Electronica (in Linz, Austria), the Institute for New Media in Frankfurt and the ZKM | Center for Art and Media Karlsruhe, he influenced the European Scene of the so-called computer art through conferences, exhibitions and publications.

In early May 2022, during the 2022 Russian invasion of Ukraine, Weibel advocated for parts of Ukraine, then under de facto Russian control, and Transnistria to be internationally recognized to allow Ukraine to reach some sort of agreement with the Russian Federation.

Weibel died in Karlsruhe, Germany on 1 March 2023, at the age of 78.

== Research and teaching ==
From 1976, Weibel taught at various institutions, including the Universität für Angewandte Kunst in Vienna, in 1981 at the Nova Scotia College of Art and Design in Halifax, Nova Scotia, Canada, and, from 1982-85 at the Gesamthochschule Kassel. In 1984 he was appointed to teach for five years as Associate Professor for Video and Digital Arts at the Center for Media Study at the State University of New York in Buffalo, New York. The same year, 1984 he became Professor for visual media at the Universität für Angewandte Kunst in Vienna. In 1989 he was assigned to set up the Institute for New Media at the Städelschule in Frankfurt, which he headed until 1994. From 1993 to 1999 he curated the Austrian pavilion at the Venice Biennale, after which took on curatorship and directorship at KMZ Arts and Media Centre in Karlsruhe, Germany.

== Curatorial activities ==
From 1986 Weibel worked as artistic advisor for the Ars Electronica, which he then headed from 1992 until 1995 as its artistic director. From 1993 to 1999, he curated the pavilion of Austria on the Venice Biennial. In the same period, from 1993 to 1999, he worked as chief curator at the Neue Galerie am Landesmuseum Joanneum in Graz, Austria. Since January 1999 Peter Weibel has been Chairman and CEO of the ZKM Center for Art and Media in Karlsruhe, Germany.

- 2021: Chiharu Shiota. Connected to Life (with Richard Castelli), ZKM I Center for Art and Media, Karlsruhe
- 2020: Critical Zones. Horizonte einer neuen Erdpolitik (with Bruno Latour), ZKM | Center for Art and Media, Karlsruhe
- 2019: Writing the History of the Future (with Margit Rosen), Zentrum für Kunst und Medien, Karlsruhe
- 2019: Seasons of Media Arts. Stadt der partizipativen Visionen (with Lívia Nolasco-Rózsás, Blanca Giménez, Olga Timurgalieva), ZKM | Center for Art and Media, Karlsruhe
- 2019: Schlosslichtspiele, ZKM | Center for Art and Media, Karlsruhe
- 2019: Open Codes. Leben in digitalen Welten (mit Blanca Giménez), Bundesministerium der Justiz und für Verbraucherschutz, Berlin
- 2019: Negativer Raum. Skulptur und Installation im 20./21. Jahrhundert (with Anett Holzheid, Daria Mille), ZKM | Center for Art and Media, Karlsruhe
- 2018: Schlosslichtspiele, ZKM | Center for Art and Media, Karlsruhe
- 2018: Kunst in Bewegung. 100 Meisterwerke mit und durch Medien. Ein operationaler Kanon (with Siegfried Zielinski, Judith Bihr, Daria Mille), ZKM | Center for Art and Media, Karlsruhe
- 2018: generator marx: kapital | digital, ""generator. medienkunstlabor trier
- 2018: DIA-LOGOS. Ramon Llull und die Kunst des Kombinierens (with Amador Vega, Siegfried Zielinski, Bettina Korintenberg), ZKM | Center for Art and Media, Karlsruhe
- 2017/2018: The Art of Immersion (with Richard Castelli and Dennis Del Favero), ZKM | Center for Art and Media, Karlsruhe
- 2017: Schlosslichtspiele, ZKM | Center for Art and Media, Karlsruhe
- 2017: Markus Lüpertz. Kunst, die im Wege steht (with Walter Smerling), ZKM | Center for Art and Media, Karlsruhe
- 2017: Kunst in Europa 1945-1968. Die Zukunft im Blick. Art in Europe 1945-1968, Staatliches Museum für Bildende Künste A. S. Puschkin, Moskau
- 2017: Bodenlos - Vilém Flusser und die Künste (with Baruch Gottlieb, Pavel Vančát, Siegfried Zielinski), GAMU (Galerie AMU), Prag
- 2016: William Kentridge: More Sweetly Play the Dance, ZKM | Center for Art and Media, Karlsruhe
- 2016: Schlosslichtspiele, ZKM | Center for Art and Media, Karlsruhe
- 2016: Liquid Identities - Lynn Hershman Leeson. Identitäten im 21. Jahrhundert (with Andreas Beitin), Lehmbruck Museum, Duisburg
- 2016: Kunst in Europa 1945-1968. Der Kontinent, den die EU nicht kennt (with Eckhart J. Gillen, Daria Mille, Daniel Bulatov), ZKM | Center for Art and Media, Karlsruhe
- 2016: Digitale Wasserspiele, ZKM | Center for Art and Media, Karlsruhe
- 2016: Bodenlos - Vilém Flusser und die Künste (with Baruch Gottlieb, Siegfried Zielinski), Akademie der Künste, Berlin
- 2016: Bodenlos - Vilém Flusser und die Künste (with Baruch Gottlieb, Siegfried Zielinski), West, Den Haag
- 2016: Beat Generation (with Jean-Jacques Lebel, Philippe-Alain Michaud), ZKM | Center for Art and Media, Karlsruhe
- 2015: Transsolar + Tetsuo Kondo. Cloudscapes, ZKM | Center for Art and Media, Karlsruhe
- 2015: Schlosslichtspiele, ZKM | Center for Art and Media, Karlsruhe
- 2015: Ryoji Ikeda. micro | macro, ZKM | Center for Art and Media, Karlsruhe
- 2015: Lichtsicht, Projektions-Biennale, Bad Rothenfelde
- 2015: Infosphäre (with Daria Mille, Giulia Bini), ZKM | Center for Art and Media, Karlsruhe
- 2015: HA Schult: Action Blue (with Bernhard Serexhe), ZKM | Center for Art and Media, Karlsruhe
- 2015: Exo-Evolution (with Sabiha Keyif, Philipp Ziegler, Giulia Bini), ZKM | Center for Art and Media, Karlsruhe
- 2015: Die Stadt ist der Star - Kunst an der Baustelle. Vom K-Punkt am Staatstheater bis zum Marktplatz (with Andreas Beitin), ZKM | Center for Art and Media, Karlsruhe
- 2015: Lynn Hershman Leeson. Civic Radar (with Andreas Beitin), Deichtorhallen Hamburg in der Sammlung Falckenberg, Hamburg
- 2015: Bodenlos - Vilém Flusser und die Künste (with Baruch Gottlieb, Siegfried Zielinski), ZKM | Center for Art and Media, Karlsruhe
- 2014: Lynn Hershman Leeson. Civic Radar (with Andreas Beitin), ZKM | Center for Art and Media, Karlsruhe
- 2011: The Global Contemporary Kunstwelten nach 1989 (with Andrea Buddensieg), ZKM Center for Art and Media, Karlsruhe
- 2011: Moderne: Selbstmord der Kunst? Im Spiegel der Sammlung der Neuen Galerie Graz (with Christa Steinle and Gudrun Danzer), Neue Galerie Graz
- 2011: Bruseum. Ein Museum für Günter Brus (with Anke Orgel), Neue Galerie Graz
- 2011: Hans Hollein (with Günther Holler-Schuster), Neue Galerie Graz
- 2011: Francesco Lo Savio – Tano Festa. The Lack of the Other (with Freddy Paul Grunert), ZKM Center for Art and Media
- 2008: youniverse, International Biennal of Contemporary Arts, Sevilla
- 2005: Lichtkunst aus Kunstlicht (with Gregor Jansen), ZKM | Center for Art and Media, Karlsruhe
- 2005: Making Things Public (with Bruno Latour), ZKM | Center for Art and Media, Karlsruhe
- 2003: M_ARS: Kunst und Krieg (with Günther Holler-Schuster), Neue Galerie Graz
- 2002: Future Cinema (with Jeffrey Shaw), ZKM | Center for Art and Media, Karlsruhe
- 2002: Iconoclash (with Bruno Latour), ZKM | Center for Art and Media, Karlsruhe
- 2000/2001: Olafur Eliasson: Surroundings surroanded, Neue Galerie Graz and ZKM | Center for Art and Media, Karlsruhe
- 2000: Net_condition (with Walter van der Crijusen, Johannes Goebel, Golo Foellmer, Hans-Peter Schwarz, Jeffrey Shaw, Benjamin Weill) ZKM | Center for Art and Media, Karlsruhe
- 1999/2000: Der anagrammatische Körper Kunsthaus Muerz, Muerzzuschlag | Neue Galerie, Graz and ZKM | Center for Art and Media, Karlsruhe
- 1999: Open Practice, 48th Biennale de Venise
- 1998: Jenseits von Kunst, MUHKA, Museum van Hedendaagse Kunst, Antwerpen; Neue Galerie, Graz; Ludwig-Museum, Budapest
- 1996: Inklusion: Exklusion, Steirischen Herbst 96, Graz
- 1993: Kontext Kunst, Neue Galerie Graz
- 1991: Das Bild nach dem letzten Bild (with Kaspar König), Galerie Metropol, Vienna
- 1990: Vom Verschwinden der Ferne (with Edith Decker), Postmuseum, Frankfurt am Main
- 1987: Logokultur, Universitaet fuer angewandte Kunst, Vienna
- 1976: Österreichs Avantgarde 1908-38 (with Oswald Oberhuber), Galerie naechst St. Stephan, Vienna

== Decorations and awards ==
- 2002: Grand Decoration of Honour for Services to the Republic of Austria
- 2009: Austrian Cross of Honour for Science and Art, 1st class
- 2013: Honorary doctorate from University of Pécs, Hungary
- 2020: Lovis Corinth prize

== Bibliography ==
- Weibel, Peter; Valie Export (1970). Bildkompendium Wiener Aktionismus und Film (in German). Frankfurt: Kohlkunstverlag.
- Weibel, Peter (1973). Kritik der Kunst. Kunst der Kritik: es says & I say (in German). Vienna, Munich: Verlag für Jugend und Volk.
- Weibel, Peter (1982). Arbeiten in den Medien Sprache, Schrift, Papier, Stein, Foto, Ton, Film und Video aus zwanzig Jahren (in German). Vienna, Munich: Jugend & Volk. ISBN 3-224-16617-7.
- Catalog (1992). Peter Weibel. Malerei zwischen Anarchie und Forschung (in German). Graz: Neue Galerie.
- Catalog (1992). Robert Fleck (ed.). Peter Weibel. Zur Rechtfertigung der hypothetischen Natur der Kunst und der Nicht-Identität in der Objektwelt (in German). Cologne: Grunnert. ISBN 3-88375-166-9.
- Romana Schuler, ed. (1996). Peter Weibel. Bildwelten 1982 ‒ 1996 (in German). Vienna: Triton. ISBN 3-901310-21-5.
- Catalog (1999). Peter Weibel: Globale Gier (in German). Klagenfurt: Kärntner Landesgalerie. ISBN 3-88375-166-9.
- Catalog (2004). Marcus Huemer; Wilhelm Meusburger (eds.). B-Picture (in German). Frankfurt a. M.: Revolver, Archiv für Aktuelle Kunst. ISBN 3-937577-75-0.
- Ecke Bonk; Peter Gente; Margit Rosen, eds. (2004). 05-03-44: Liebesgrüsse aus Odessa: für Peter Weibel (in German). Berlin: Merve-Verlag. ISBN 3-88396-194-9.
- Alfred Kolleritsch; Christa Steinle, eds. (2004). Peter Weibel: X-Dream (in German). Graz: Droschl. ISBN 3-85420-671-2.
- Weibel, Peter (2004). Gamma und Amplitude: medien- und kunsttheoretische Schriften (in German). Berlin: Fundus. ISBN 3-86572-515-5.
- Weibel, Peter (2006). Das offene Werk 1964‒1979 (in German). Ostfildern: Hatje Cantz. ISBN 978-3-7757-1539-3.
- "Peter Weibel": Sarah Cook, Verina Gfader, Beryl Graham & Axel Lapp, A Brief History of Curating New Media Art: Conversations with Curators, Berlin: The Green Box, 2010: pp. 27–37. ISBN 978-3-941644-20-5.
- Car Culture—Medien der Mobilität. (Ed.): Peter Weibel, Zentrum für Kunst und Medientechnologie, Karlsruhe 2011, ISBN 978-3-9282-0142-1.
- Weibel, Peter; Fruk, Ljiljana, eds. (2013). Molecular aesthetics. Cambridge, MA: MIT Press. ISBN 978-0-262-01878-4. OCLC 813540877.
- Beuys Brock Vostell. Aktion Demonstration Partizipation 1949–1983. (Ed.): Peter Weibel, ZKM - Zentrum für Kunst und Medientechnologie, Hatje Cantz, Karlsruhe, 2014, ISBN 978-3-7757-3864-4.
- Der Wiener Kreis – Aktualität in Wissenschaft, Literatur, Architektur und Kunst. (Eds.): Ulrich Arnswald, Friedrich Stadler, and Peter Weibel, LIT Verlag, Wien, 2019, ISBN 978-3643509376.
- Weibel, Peter (2022). Negative Space: Trajectories of Sculpture in the 20th and 21st Centuries. Cambridge: MIT Press. ISBN 9780262044868.
