= Thomas Steiner (director) =

Austrian film director

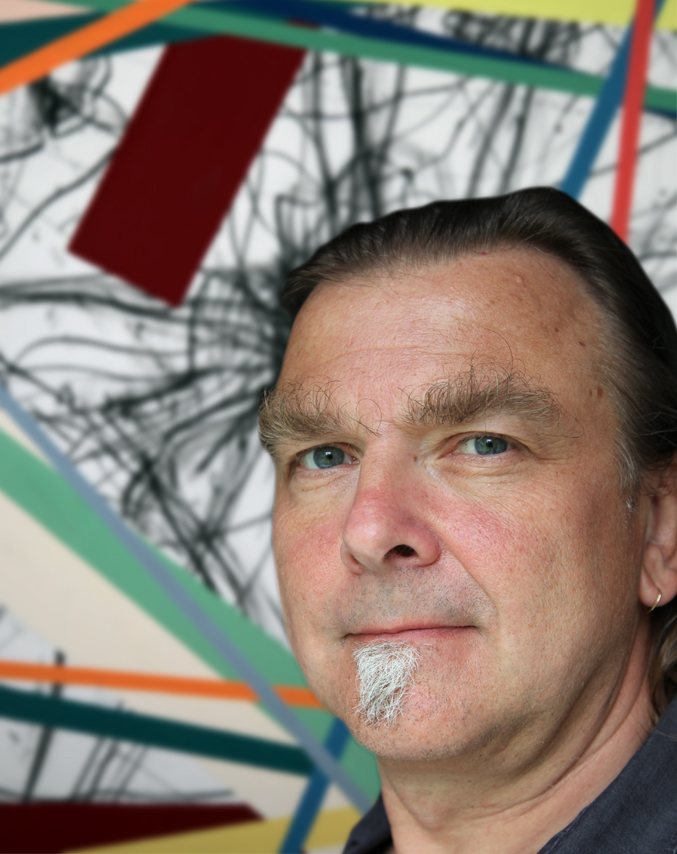
- Born: 1956; Wels, Austria
- Occupation: filmmaker

Thomas Steiner ([ˈstaɪnər]; born 1956), is an Austrian experimental film director of short films, and painter.

He was born in 1956 in Wels, Austria. He studied at the College of Design in Linz and at the Academy of Applied Arts in Vienna. In 1979 he was one of the founders of the Stadtwerkstatt, Linz. In 1986 he established a Studio for Experimental Animation Film. He has won various awards for his works. Thomas Steiner is member of the Upper Austrian Artists Club, ASIFA Austria and the Wiener Künstlerhaus. Since 1984 participation in filmfestivals all over the world. Since 1990 many solo shows and participations in Austria, Germany, Italy and USA.

Awards:

- 1994 3. Preis beim Kunstwettbewerb des Kulturrings der OÖ Wirtschaft
- 1995 Preis des Landes Salzburg beim 24. Österreichischen Grafikwettbwerb
- 1996 1. Preis beim Kunstwettbewerb der Bau - Holding, Klagenfurt, OÖ. Landeskulturpreis für Experimentalfilm
- 1998 Honorable Mention, Expo of Short Film & Video, New York,
- 1999 Honorable Mention, Film Festival of Ann Arbor, USA,
- 2005 Nominierung für den Medienkunstpreis des SWR.
- 2011 Irseer Pegasus
