= Dumb Type =

Japanese artist collective

Dumb Type is an artist collective based in Kyoto, Japan founded in 1984.

Dumb Type is a group of creative art forms that express the new and daily life of the twentieth century modern and technological world of Japan. During the 1980s Dumb Type created their first show representing the idea of how technology is arising a dark matter through people's daily lives. Members are trained in varied disciplines, including visual arts, theatre, dance, architecture, music composition and computer programming. Their work ranges across such diverse media as art exhibitions, performances, audiovisuals and publications.

Dumb Type is known for portraying a dark, cynical, and humorous world in which technology is a way of life. In a 1990 interview in High Performance, the late Teiji Furuhashi, one of Dumb Type's co-founders, described their work as political in nature: "Something Japanese theater never does. Japanese audiences don't want to see that. They want to avoid it. They just want entertainment. Yes, I think we should always have a political view. We should represent that this is Japan." Notable in a country plagued by political apathy, the group has played the unpopular role of HIV/AIDS activist, organizing symposia and other events, motivated in part by the fact that Furuhashi died of HIV complications in 1995.

Dumb Type's name connotes both stupidity and the feeling of being overwhelmed into submission by society. The founding leader of the group Furuhashi, suggested that the name "Dumb Type" expressed an idea of the reality that Japan has become because its technology and the attraction to the media. The society around Japan became very superficial and everyone was aware of the media around them but felt overwhelmed with all the information given to them. This inspired the artistic performances expressing their feelings about it.

While based in Kyoto, Japan's ancient capital, Dumb Type is oriented more to the global than the local, the contemporary over the traditional. Dumb Type members state that Japanese art movements have had little influence on their work. Furuhashi explained that the core group—Furuhashi, Toru Koyamada, Yukihiro Hozumi, Shiro Takatani, Takayuki Fujimoto and Hiromasa Tomari—began working together in 1982, while still students at Kyoto City University of Arts. "We were frustrated artists, and wanted to start creating something new with our skills. Most of the time we spent discussing society or whatever, not specific art things. When someone had an idea it would be presented on a piece of paper. If the group was interested, we made it come true. At first the idea would be really open, then gradually it became something very specific. In that way, we're really democratic. Dumb Type is a collaborative group; we don't want a king."

Their work has been exhibited and performed at notable venues internationally. Several solo exhibitions have been dedicated to Dumb Type, at the Centre Pompidou-Metz in 2018, at the MOT-Museum of Contemporary Art in Tokyo in 2020 and at the Haus der Kunst in Munich in 2022 among others. Some of their artworks are part of the permanent collections worldwide (Tokyo Metropolitan Museum of Photography, Musée d'art contemporain de Lyon, Centre Pompidou and the Museum of Modern Art (MoMA) in New York, among others). In 2022, Dumb Type was commissioned by the Japan Foundation to represent Japan at the 59th International Art Exhibition of the Venice Biennale.
