= Dennis Del Favero =

Australian artist and academic

Dennis Del Favero is an Australian artist and academic. He has been awarded numerous Artist-in-Residencies and Fellowships, including an Artist-in-Residence at Neue Galerie Graz and inaugural Visiting Professorial Fellowship at ZKM Center for Art and Media, Karlsruhe. He is an Australian Research Council Laureate Fellow, Scientia Professor of Digital Innovation and Director of the iCinema Centre for Interactive Cinema Research at the University of New South Wales; Visiting Professor at Royal College of Art, London and Honorary Professorial Fellow at The University of Melbourne; Member of European Network on Extreme fiRe behaviOur (NERO) Working Group; Studio Corpi Quodlibet Editorial Board Member; and former executive director of the Australian Research Council | Humanities and Creative Arts.

He was also elected a Fellow of the Australian Academy of the Humanities in 2024.

== Life and work ==
Del Favero was born in Sydney of Italian migrants from Cadore, Veneto. He completed undergraduate, doctoral and postdoctoral studies in philosophy and art at the University of Sydney, the University of New South Wales, the University of Technology, Sydney and ZKM, Germany.

Del Favero's work artistically explores the visualization of unpredictable climate events such as firestorms, resulting from global warming, utilizing digital media and Artificial Intelligence. His work is particularly interested in exploring our interaction with these events using virtual rehearsals to enhance our perceptual, experiential and practical preparedness.

His work has been extensively curated internationally for group exhibitions such as the International Symposium on Electronic Art (ISEA) 2024 & 2013 and SIGGRAPH Asia 2024, 2019, 2018 & 2013, Düsseldorf & Cologne Open, 2022 & 2017, Art Cologne 2022, 2017, 2016, 2014 & 1995, Future Design, Experimenta Center, Heilbronn; The Art of Immersion, ZKM, Karlsruhe, 2017; Videonale, Kunstmuseum Bonn, 2014 & 2005; ''Biennale of Architecture, Rotterdam, 2009; Imagining Media@ZKM, Centre for Art and Media, Karlsruhe, 2009; Biennial of Australian Art, Adelaide, 2008; Artescienza: Spazio Deformato, Casa dell'Architettura, Rome, 2006; Cinemas du Futur, Euralille, 2004; Future Cinema, Kiasma Museum for Contemporary Art, Helsinki; (dis)Locations, ACMI - Australian Centre for the Moving Image, Melbourne, 2001; Fotofeis, Edinburgh & Glasgow, 1998; and Kriegszustand, Battle of the Nations War Memorial, Leipzig, 1996.

== Representing galleries ==
- Galerie Brigitte Schenk, Cologne
- Mais Wright, Sydney

== See also ==
- Photography
- Video art
- New media
- T Visionarium
- iCinema
- Scenario (artwork)

== See also ==
- O'Brien, D. (2020). The Pervasive and the Digital: Immersive Worlds in Four Interactive Artworks, Handbook of Research on Recent Developments in Internet Activism and Political Participation (69-85), ed. Y. Ibrahim, IGI Global. https://doi.org/10.4018/978-1-7998-4796-0.ch005
- Hemelryk Donald, S. (2019). Shaming Australia: Cinematic Responses to the “Pacific Solution”. Alphaville: Journal of Film and Screen Media 18: http://eprints.lincoln.ac.uk/34688/ (Retrv. 06/12/2019)
- Thurow, S. (2017). Response to the Metamaterial Turn: Performative Digital Methodologies for Creative Practice and Analytical Documentation in the Arts. Australian and New Zealand Journal of Art 17.2: 238–50. DOI: 10.1080/14434318.2017.1450071
- Chatelet, C. (2017). Le Corps à L’œuvre: La Corporéité des Images Interactives. In Matérialté des Images et Matérialismes Esthétiques, Université Paul-Valéry Montpellier, October 2–3.
- Kracke, B. & Ries, M. (2015). Expanded Senses: Neue Sinnlichkeit und Sinnesarbeit in der Spätmoderne. New Conceptions of the Sensual, Sensorial and the Work of the Senses in Late Modernity. Bielefeld: transcript.
- Favero, P. (2014). Learning to Look Beyond the Frame: Reflections on the Changing Meaning of Images in the Age of Digital Media Practices. Visual Studies 29.2: 166–79.
- Grehan, H. (2014). An Unresolvable Dramaturgy: Dennis Del Favero's Todtnauberg and What It Means to Respond. Performance Research 19(6): 15–21.
- Frohne, U. (2013). ...Natürliches Artikulieren... Transkription 2.4. (winter): 346–88.
- Barker, T. (2012). Images and Eventfulness: Expanded Cinema and Experimental Research at the University of New South Wales. Studies in Australian Cinema 2. DOI:10.1386/sac.6.2.111_1
- Scheer, E. (2011). Scenario. Sydney/Karlsruhe: UNSW/ZKM Press.
- Smith, T. (2011). Transnational Virtuality: New Media Art, Contemporary Concerns. In J. Anderson (Ed.), The Cambridge Companion to Australian Art (248-60). Cambridge: Cambridge University Press.
- McQuire, S. & Radywyl, N. (2010). From Object to Platform: Art, Digital Technology and Time. Time Society 19(1): 5-27.
- Sielke, Sabine (2008). "Surfacing Depths". In D. Del Favero, U. Frohne & P. Weibel (eds.), Un_Imaginable. Ostfildern: Hatje Cantz.
- Bennett, Jill (2008). T_Visionarium: A User's Guide. Karlsruhe/Sydney: ZKM & UNSW Press.
- Annear, Judy (2007). Photography: Art Gallery of New South Wales Collection. Sydney: Art Gallery of New South Wales.
- Flachbart, Georg & Peter Weibel (2005). Disappearing Architecture: From Real to Virtual to Quantum. Basel: Birkhauser.
- Gibson, Ross (2003). Reverberation: Remembrance and the Moving Image. Melbourne: Australian Centre for the Moving Image.
- Weibel, Peter & John Barrett-Lennard (2000). Requiem. Graz/Perth: Neue Galerie & John Curtin Gallery.
