= Saburo Teshigawara =

Japanese choreographer and dancer

Saburo Teshigawara (勅使川原 三郎, Teshigawara Saburō, born 1953) is a Japanese choreographer and dancer who was born in Tokyo and became known for founding a company named KARAS along with Kei Miyata in 1985. On September 12, 2013, he performed Mirror and Music at the Kennedy Center which was highly praised by the London Evening Standard. He is teaching at Tama Art University department of Scenography Design, Drama, and Dance as a professor.

== Honours ==
- Medal with Purple Ribbon (2009)
- Person of Cultural Merit (2022)
