= Async (album) =

async

Studio album by Ryuichi Sakamoto
- Released: March 29, 2017
- Recorded: April–December 2016
- Studios: The Studio; New York City; Bastyr University Chapel; Kenmore, Washington; Germano Studios; New York City; Kyoto City University of Arts; Kyoto; Museum of Arts and Design; New York City; Gateway Mastering; Portland, Maine
- Genres: Electronic; experimental; ambient
- Length: 60:31
- Labels: Commmons; Milan
- Producers: Ryuichi Sakamoto; Mai Yuda

Ryuichi Sakamoto chronology
Year Book 1980-1984 (2017)	async (2017)	ASYNC – REMODELS (2017)

async is the nineteenth solo studio album of Japanese musician Ryuichi Sakamoto and his first one in eight years since Out of Noise (2009). It is also his first full-length solo record since recovering from throat cancer in 2015. Consisting of a combination of unusual interpretations of familiar musical instruments, textures both acoustic and electronically made, samples of recordings of people such as David Sylvian and Paul Bowles doing readings, and everyday sounds borrowed from field recordings of city streets, async has underlying themes of the worries of the end of life and the interaction of differing viewpoints in humanity.

Promoted with two art museum installations, a short film contest, and premiering via a listening event at Big Ears Festival, async was first released in Japan by Sakamoto's label Commmons in March 2017 before Milan distributed it to other nations in April 2017. It was critically acclaimed, landed in the top twenty of the Japanese albums chart and in the top five of Billboard's American Top Classical Albums chart, and was ranked the best album of 2017 by Fact magazine. A set of remixes of songs from async, titled ASYNC – REMODELS, was released in December 2017.

== Background ==
Since 2009, Ryuichi Sakamoto had an eight-year period where he was unable to inspire himself in his composition process. As a result, he focused most of his time on scoring films instead of producing solo material. He started sketching ideas for a solo album in 2014, but they were scrapped after he was diagnosed with throat cancer in 2014, after which he had to pause his career entirely. Despite recovering from the disease in August 2015, Sakamoto thought async would be his last album: "That’s why I tried to forget all the rules and forms, anything. I just wanted to put down just what I wanted to hear, just a sound or music, it doesn’t matter. This could be the last time." He began making it entirely from scratch in April 2016, which was after completing his soundtrack for the film Rage (2016), and finished it in eight months. The only track made before Sakamoto's cancer diagnosis that appears on async is "andata."

== Sounds and underlying themes ==
Inspired by the minimal structures of the works of Claude Debussy and the free jazz compositions of John Coltrane, async, as Milan Records summarized, is a set of representations of Sakamoto's thinking that "plays with ideas of a-synchronism, prime numbers, chaos, quantum physics and the blurred lines of life and artificiality/noise and music." Sakamoto conceived the album as the soundtrack for a nonexistent movie by Andrei Tarkovsky, whose works mostly deal with mortality (see the Worries of death subsection of this article) and employed walking scenes with the type of Foley featured on async.

When making async, "I just wanted to hear sounds of things, everyday things, even the sounds of instruments, musical instruments as things," Sakamoto said. Sakamoto cited the works of sound art sculptor Harry Bertoia as a major influence when making the album. The instrumentation includes both regular orchestral instruments and unusual acoustic and programmed textures, more specifically bizarre interpretations of otherwise familiar instruments and the "musical aspect[s]" of everyday noise. async employs a variety of sound-producing techniques, such as field recordings, making mist textures out of chorales, and wailing sounds from glass. Some of the tracks include out-of-tune pianos; he recorded two Steinway pianos he had in his home studio, and a piano that was drowned in tsunami water was used on the track "Zure." He thought it was "nature" that was responsible for the notes the broken pianos played: "the piano is a very systematically, industrially-designed thing, but they were a part of nature, taken from nature. Mankind artificially tuned and set the well-tempered scale, but the thing is if you leave the piano for a long time without a tuning, it will be out of tune."

"Tri" is an unedited recording of triangles performed by three musicians: Ian Antonio, Levy Lorenzo, and Ross Karre. In a 2017 conversation with Sakamoto, Ruth Saxelby assumed the triangle sounds that were in the later part of the track were digitally programmed. However, Sakamoto corrected Saxelby by saying "Tri" went through more than ten takes because the three musicians were "perfectionists" and thus wanted the triangles to sound machine-like.

=== Asynchronization and human duality ===
As Sakamoto described the album's main idea, Sakamoto said it was human nature most people "find pleasure in being in sync. That's why I wanted to create untraditional music that doesn't synchronize[, because it's like] speaking in a language that doesn't exist." He wanted to make a record like this for a long time, but it was difficult to do because he "wanted to make something async but still musical."

According to Sakamoto, his musical interests were moving towards "sound and music" rather than just "music" while producing the album, and thus he incorporated field recordings to capture "lots of strange sounds." Sakamoto did the field recordings by walking through streets in New York City, Tokyo, Kyoto, and Paris with a cell phone microphone in his hand, activity that made up for four months of the album's production. The sounds he captured were those all people unavoidably encounter in everyday life, such as street noise, animal sounds, leaves, water, and rain. Composing the score for The Revenant (2015), a film very heavy on themes about nature in both its story and music, influenced how Sakamoto produced async. For "Walker," Sakamoto spent around ten to fifteen minutes recording his footsteps while walking in a forest filled with leaves, which makes up most of the track. It was a forest that surrounded Philip Johnson's Glass House, which Sakamoto later used to record the improvisational piece "Glass" with Alva Noto.

On async, all of its sounds come together but never create a proper harmony. However, Sakamoto described these sounds as "significant in their own way because their "existence has meaning." He explained, "As human beings, we [...] take the liberty to decide which sound is good or bad. [...] I'm suggesting we open our ears and listen to each sound without prejudice." Sakamoto did this to symbolize as well as commentate on how the differing viewpoints of humanity worked: "In this world of myriad viewpoints and unlimited information, every single person is choosing only the information that he or she is interested in, and people with similar interests gather and form a group. Then, groups with similar interests exchange views with one another, accelerating the movement to narrow the conversation down to ever-more specific views bound by a particular concern. And so, groups with different interests barely communicate with each other, or even if they do, they tend to dismiss the views of the other." The message of async is that, like dissonant sounds coming together to create music, humans of all different viewpoints should come together and respect each other.

This theme of async was compared by writer Karl Smith to the works of Shane Carruth, whose films also deal with chaos in human nature. He used "Zure"'s mixture of "intangible synthetic panes with the more earthly, percussive tones of the piano" and "Walker"'s combination of noises with a "call and response [of] gentle swells and vibrations" as examples of the record's use of juxtapositions, which present "the idea that any one thing is more than just that one thing." While a majority of async consists of subdued pieces, the album also contains more dissonant tracks like "Tri," "disintegration," which places awkwardly-tuned piano plucks aside warm synthesizer pads, and the title track, which includes harshly plucked pizzicato strings. This is to symbolize a "never ending pendulum swing between solace and chaos," Paste magazine stated.

=== Worries of death ===
Some critics noted Sakamoto's worries about death seeping into the album, which were influenced not only by his experience with cancer but also the many earthquakes and tsunamis that occurred in Japan in 2011. He said in an interview, "We were warned about how our civilization is fragile and how the force of nature is great." David Sylvian, who reads a poem by Arseny Tarkovsky on the song "Life, Life" over pizzicato strings, synthesizers, and a shō, said async "expresses a love and gratitude for life accompanied by the knowledge of its fragility." On "Life, Life," Sylvian reads, "To one side from ourselves, to one side from the world / Wave follows wave to break on the shore, / On each wave is a star, a person, a bird, / Dreams, reality, death - on wave after wave." The recording was done in 2011 and was one of ten poem readings Sylvian submitted to Sakamoto for a charity concert supporting victims of the 2011 Tōhoku earthquake and tsunami.

"Fullmoon" begins with a quote from Paul Bowles reading his novel The Sheltering Sky (1949) over a sine wave: "We get to think of life as an inexhaustible well. Yet everything happens only a certain number of times, and a very small number, really." He also says on the song, "Because we don’t know when we will die, we get to think of life as an inexhaustible well. How many more times will you watch the full moon rise? Perhaps 20. And yet it all seems limitless." The later part of the song depicts Bowles' quote being spoken in other languages by Sakamoto's friends over an instrumental of piano and synthesizers.

The recording of Bowles saying the quote also appears in the end of the 1990 film adaptation of the book, which Sakamoto composed the score for. Sakamoto explained the sample "struck me so much" when he first listened to it, reasoning that it was "so heavy and serious about life and death, and that excerpt [plays in the film] right after the husband dies in the middle of the Sahara, in the middle of nowhere." He used the recording for Bowles' voice, as it "sounds something very profound to me: it's not too dark, it's very light; it doesn't sound too serious." Bernardo Bertolucci, who wrote and directed the film adaptation, speaks the Italian version of the quote on the track.

== Release ==
async premiered via a listening event at Big Ears Festival that ran from March 23 to 26, 2017, where the album was presented in 5.1 surround sound. Commmons first released async in Japan on CD and in digital stores on March 29, 2017. The vinyl version of the album was also initially planned to come out in the country the same day, but due to sound quality issues was postponed to May 17. Thump premiered async worldwide via streaming on April 24, 2017, before Milan Records issued it to other formats on April 28, 2017.

== Promotion ==
From April 4 to May 28, 2017, the Watari Museum of Contemporary Art ran an exhibition titled async, which consists of visuals by artists Shiro Takatani (who was also responsible for the cover art of the album), Apichatpong Weerasethakul, Neo Sora and Albert "Zakkubalan" Tholen performed over cuts from the album. The exhibition's moving visuals consisted of distorted footage of a crowd of people and Sakamoto's home and studio. A follow-up to the installation, titled IS YOUR TIME, ran from December 9, 2017, to March 11, 2018, at NTT InterCommunication Center, and also featured music from async and visuals by Takatani.

The first live performance of async in the United States was held in the Veterans Room at the Seventh Regiment Armory on the Upper East Side of Manhattan in New York City on April 26, 2017. A concert film of the performance titled Ryuichi Sakamoto PERFORMANCE IN NEW YORK: async premiered in Japanese theaters on January 27, 2018. From August 4 until September 30, 2017, submissions were open for a contest ran by Sakamoto and Weerasethakul titled the async Short Film Competition, where filmmakers had to produce a film using music from async. From the approximately 800 entries that were submitted, In a Happy Place by Sikkim-based filmmaker Sandup Lepcha won the contest, receiving $3,000 and an opportunity to have Sakamoto compose for his next film.

== Critical reception ==
Professional ratings
Aggregate scores
Source	Rating
AnyDecentMusic?	8.1/10
Metacritic	85/100
Review scores
Source	Rating
AllMusic	4/5 stars
The A.V. Club	B
Exclaim!	9/10
Mixmag	10/10
Mojo	4/5 stars
Paste	8.7/10
Pitchfork	8.0/10
PopMatters	8/10
Record Collector	4/5 stars
Resident Advisor	4.0/5

async garnered very positive reviews from writers upon its release. Mixmag gave async a ten-out-of-ten review, describing it as "full of church organs, hazy reverb, rippling synths and poetry about mortality and eternity, as well as Sakamoto’s distinctive piano, sonar bleeps and unforgettable melodies. It’s arguably the most beautiful record you’ll hear this year." Lotus Land praised async as "yet another entry in his oeuvre which simultaneously feels unique from his other releases and yet inescapably Sakamoto in its depth and emotion." Kevin Press of Exclaim! called it "challenging and moving," highlighting its "unique ability to create genuine beauty with a varied — at times abrasive — palette" and the fact that Sakamoto "remains a radical after all these years." As Paul Bowler summarized async, "Understandably ruminative in nature, it’s a renewed sense of creative vigour which provides the driving force on a piece of work which stands among the composer’s best."

Avant-garde music magazine The Wire claimed, "its coherence of tonality and timbre gives it the feel of an imaginary soundtrack and yet each track has its own internal logic and direction which means that it never sounds like a grab-bag of musical supervisor’s cues but like a proper album of songs." Journalist Andy Beta analyzed the album has a "warmth and fragility" that sets it apart from most experimental records. Andrew Ryce praised it for feeling "universal," where "anyone can pick up the objects around them and make music, and Sakamoto shows how engaging even the simplest exercises in sound can be." The A.V. Club's Sean O'Neal wrote that when hearing all the songs in order, they "creat[e] a transcendent introspective mood that allows the listener to hear their own story within them," but when the songs are heard separately, they "can be a bit boring."

Some critics spotlighted the use of elements of Sakamoto's previous works, Ryce calling them the best parts of async. Spectrum Culture compared it to the composer's earlier albums in that "it sacrifices coherency and consistency in getting as many of its creator’s ideas on wax as possible. Some of the ideas here are great, some are bad, most are interesting." The spoken word pieces garnered mixed opinions. Some found them to be the album's weakest tracks, finding them showy ways of presenting themes the album's other tracks did more effectively, James Hadfield of The Japan Times opined "the vocals sit uncomfortably in the mix." However, Beta called them "striking inclusion[s]," PopMatters critic Chris Ingalls felt they added "more layers of sonic curiosities," and Bowler described them as the album's "most oddly affecting" moments.

== Accolades ==
Publication	Accolade	Rank	Ref.
AllMusic	Best of 2017: Favorite Electronic Albums	—N/a	
Exclaim!	Top 29 Albums of 2017 So Far	29	
Exclaim!	Best of 2017: Top 10 Improv and Avant-Garde Albums	—N/a	
Fact	The 50 Best Albums of 2017	1	
Pitchfork	The 20 Best Experimental Albums of 2017	4	
The Quietus and Norman Records	Albums Of The Year 2017	67	
Rolling Stone	20 Best Avant Albums of 2017	16	
Spin	The 50 Best Albums of 2017 So Far	45	
Time Out New York	29 Best Albums of 2017	20	
The Vinyl Factory	The 50 Best Albums of 2017	10	
The Vinyl Factory	20 Best Albums of 2017 So Far	—N/a	
The Wire	Best Releases of 2017	13	

== Track listing ==
async – Standard version
No.	Title	Length
1.	"andata"	4:39
2.	"disintegration"	5:46
3.	"solari"	3:52
4.	"ZURE"	5:11
5.	"walker"	4:20
6.	"stakra"	3:41
7.	"ubi"	4:03
8.	"fullmoon"	5:13
9.	"async"	2:44
10.	"tri"	3:28
11.	"Life, Life"	4:23
12.	"honj"	3:41
13.	"ff"	5:12
14.	"garden"	4:18
Total length:		60:31

async – Vinyl edition bonus track
No.	Title	Length
15.	"Water State 2"	7:14
Total length:		67:45

Sample credits

- "Fullmoon" features a sample of a recording by Recorded Picture Company of Paul Bowles reading The Sheltering Sky (1949).
- "Life, Life" features the poem "And this I dreamt, and this I dream" from Arseny Tarkovsky's Life, Life (2010)

== Personnel ==
Derived from the liner notes of async.

- Composed and produced by Ryuichi Sakamoto
- Administration and assistant production by Mai Yuda
- Associate production by Norika Sora
- Production managed by Alec Fellman
- Assistant engineering by Jason Staniulis, Matthew Sim, and Alec Fellman
- Recorded by Alex Venguer, Ryan Kelly, and Seigen Ono
- Piano technician work by Kaz Tsujio
- Recorded and mixed by Conrad Hensel at Germano Studios in New York City
- Mastered by Bob Ludwig at Gateway Mastering in Portland, Maine
- "Walker" and "Water State 2" recorded at the Museum of Arts and Design in New York City
- "Life, Life," "Honj," and "Water State 2" recorded at Kyoto City University of Arts
- Also recorded at The Studio in New York City and Bastyr University Chapel
- Guitar and computer on "Andata" by Christian Fennesz
- Singing bowls on "Fullmoon" by N.S.S.
- Spoken word vocals on "Fullmoon" performed by Andri Magnason, Bernardo Bertolucci, Carsten Nicolai, Christine Leboutte, José Lavat, Keyko Nimsay, Priscilla Leung Siu-wai, Sergei Mihailov, Shirin Neshat, and Tang Kit Ming
- Words on "Fullmoon" by Paul Bowles
- Triangle on "Tri" by Ian Antonio, Levy Lorenzo, and Ross Karre
- Shō on "Life, Life" and "Water State 2" by Ko Ishikawa
- Vocals on "Life, Life" by Luca
- Spoken word vocals on "Life, Life" by David Sylvian
- Words on "Life, Life" by Arseny Tarkovsky
- Shamisen on "Honj" by Honjoh Hidejiro
- "Garden" recorded by Northwest Sinfonia
- Concertmaster on "Garden" by Simon James
- Contractor on "Garden" by David Sabee
- Engineering on "Garden" by Conrad Hensel and John Winters
- Pro Tools engineering on "Garden" by Kory Kruckenberg
- Stage Management on "Garden" by Jon Schluckebier
- Artwork directed and photographed by Shiro Takatani
- Artwork produced by Yoko Takatani

== Release history ==
Region	Date	Format(s)	Label
Japan	March 29, 2017	CD; digital download	Commmons
Worldwide	April 24, 2017	Streaming	Thump
Worldwide	April 28, 2017	CD; digital download; vinyl	Milan
Japan	May 2, 2017	Vinyl	Commmons

== Charts ==
Chart (2017)	Peak position
Belgian Albums (Ultratop Flanders)	69
Belgian Albums (Ultratop Wallonia)	61
Italian Albums (FIMI)	86
Japanese Albums (Billboard Japan)	20
UK Vinyl Albums (OCC)	37
US Top Classical Albums (Billboard)	5

== Remix album ==
On December 13, 2017, Commons released ASYNC – REMODELS, a collection of remixes of tracks from async by musicians such as Oneohtrix Point Never, Johann Johannsson, and Arca. The album landed at number 15 on Billboard's United States Classical Albums chart.

== Legacy ==
A reinterpretation of async, "async - immersion 2023" was released on February 2, 2024. This project, a collaboration with Shiro Takatani, was initially presented as a site-specific installation in the basement of the Kyoto Shimbun Building. The release aims to replicate the auditory experience of the 'async - immersion 2023' exhibit showcased at AMBIENT KYOTO. Designed to be experienced asynchronously, the project diverges from traditional synchronization of sound and image reflecting Sakamoto's in an immersive experience.
