= Open Reel Ensemble =

Japanese electronic trio

Open Reel Ensemble オープンリールアンサンブル
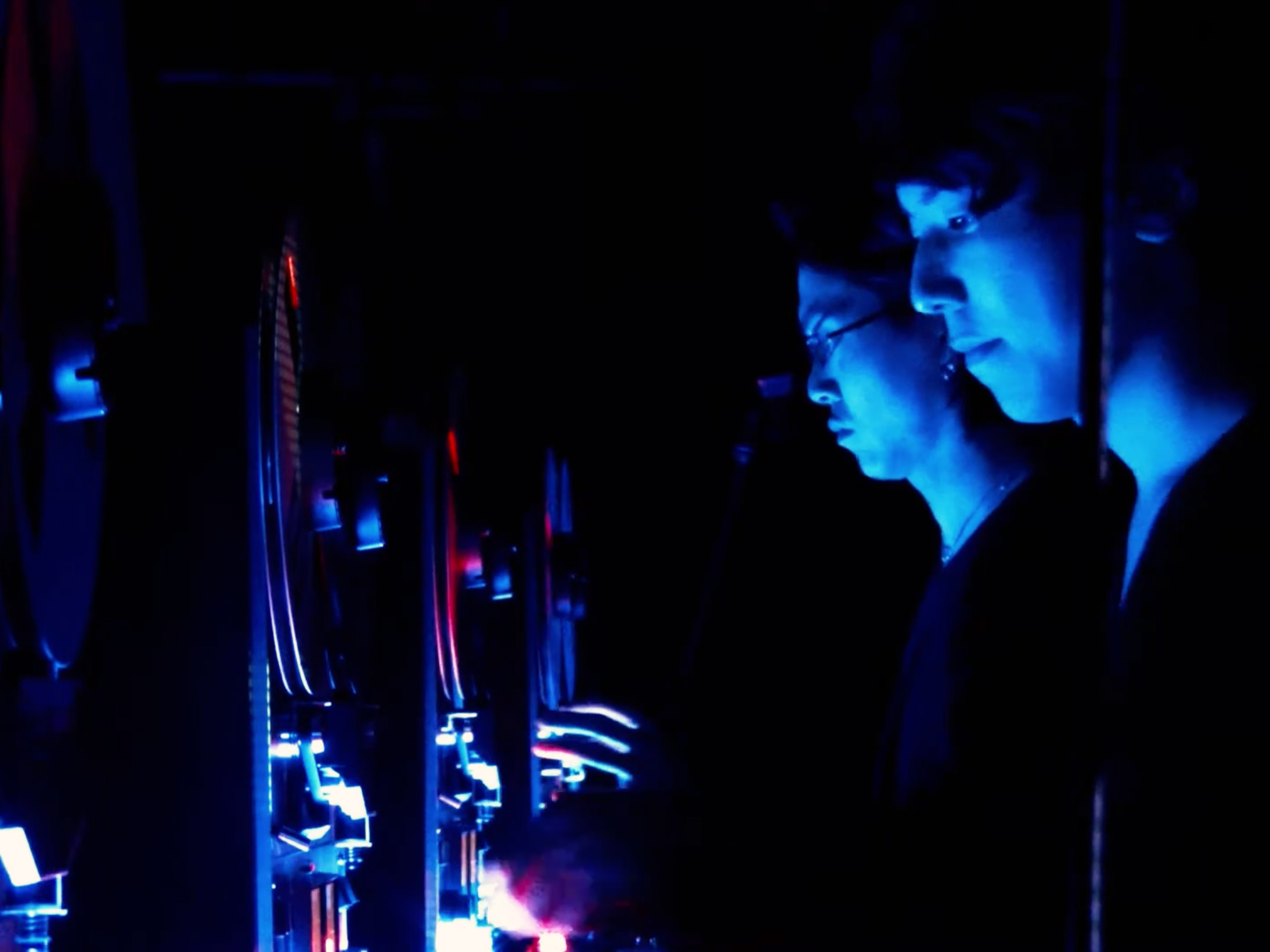
- Open Reel Ensemble performing in 2012

Background information
- Instruments: Open-reel recordings
- Years active: 2009–present
- Labels: commmons; P-Vine; Sony Music Japan
- Members: Ei Wada; Haruka Yoshida; Masaru Yoshida
- Past members: Kimitoshi Sato; Takumi Namba
- Website: openreelensemble.com

Open Reel Ensemble (Japanese: オープンリールアンサンブル, Hepburn: Ōpun Rīru Ansanburu) is a Japanese band known for their use of open-reel recordings to create music. Formed in 2009, it consists of members Ei Wada, Haruka Yoshida and Masaru Yoshida. The band originally also included members Kimitoshi Sato and Takumi Mamba, who departed in 2015.

After experimenting with open reels in his teenage years, Wada and his friends established the band following a university assignment for a performance presentation. The band garnered acclaim with performances at the NTT InterCommunication Center and Ars Electronica, earning them recognition and an award from the Japan Media Arts Festival. Their works have been used for Issei Miyake's fashion shows. They have released three albums, Open Reel Ensemble (2012), Tape and Cloth (2013), and Vocal Code (2015).

== History ==
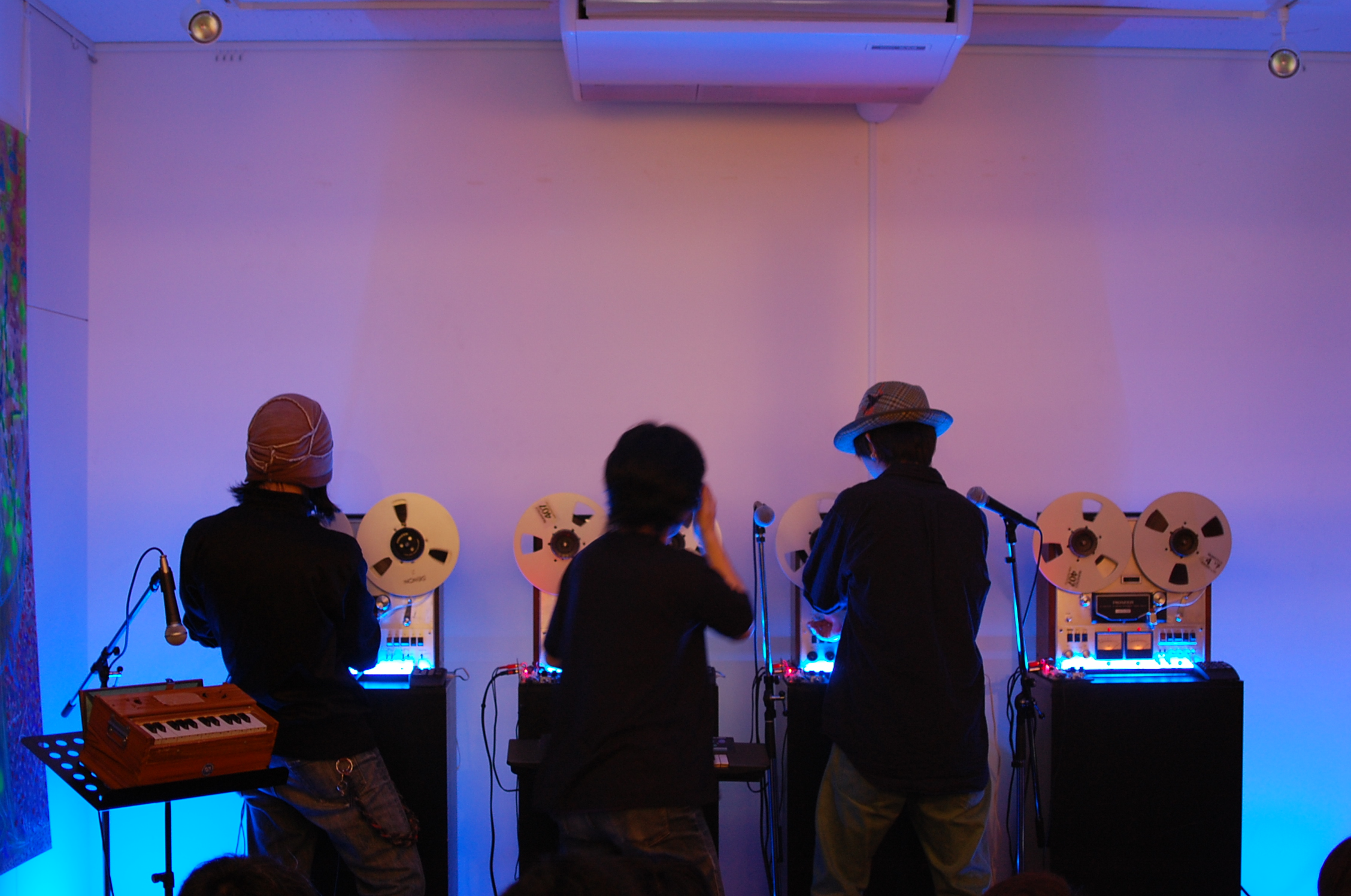
Open Reel Ensemble performing at MTM03 in 2009

=== 2009–2012: Formation ===
Ei Wada had been experimenting with old tapes to create sounds since his teenage years. He received a pair of tape recorders from a friend of his father, who worked at a radio station. One day, while handling them, he accidentally tripped and attempted to fix the reels with his hands. This led him to realize that manipulating the reels could turn them into musical instruments. This incident, along with a family trip to Indonesia during his childhood where he witnessed a gamelan performance, inspired him.

He and the other members, Haruka Yoshida, Masaru Yoshida, Kimitoshi Sato, and Takumi Mamba, had been friends since their teenage years, attending junior high and high school together. The group would gather at Wada's home, where he played the reel-to-reel in front of them. They later attended Tama Art University in Tokyo, where Wada studied programming but continued experimenting with using reels as instruments. During university, Wada received an assignment for a group performance presentation. To brainstorm ideas, he brought the reel-to-reel machine, and the group began experimenting with it, connecting the open reel to a computer and cutting wires. This project ultimately led to the formation of the group in 2009.

That same year, the band won the Excellence Award in the Student CG Contest Interactive Division of the Japan Media Arts Festival. Their performances at NTT InterCommunication Center and Ars Electronica garnered attention, prompting them to transition from a purely visual project to a combined visual and audio one. They began experimenting with incorporating their ideas into songs, using trial and error to create songs that effectively captured the feelings of the reels.

=== 2012–2015: First releases ===
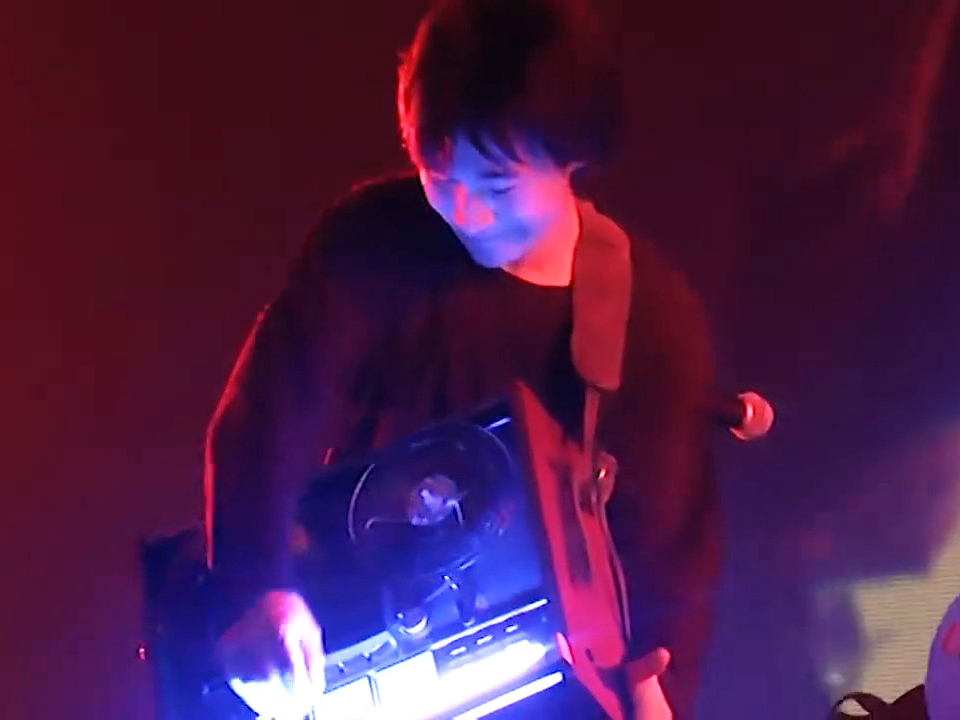
Ei Wada during an Open Reel Ensemble performance in 2012

On June 27, 2012, they released their debut album, Open Reel Ensemble, featuring collaborations with artists like Yukihiro Takahashi, Etsuko Yakushimaru, Money Mark, and Gota Yashiki. Released on Ryuichi Sakamoto's label commmons, the album includes the track "Joseph Voice 9.5 cm/s," which features a sample of Franz Joseph I of Austria's voice from the world's oldest surviving magnetic recording by Valdemar Poulsen. Their music began to be featured in Issey Miyake's Paris Collection for multiple seasons. On July 17, 2013, they followed up with their second album Tape and Cloth.

=== 2015–present: Vocal Code and Sato and Namba's departure ===
Open Reel Ensemble performing Cyklepedia in 2025

In May 2015, the band announced the departure of Sato and Namba, who planned to focus on their own band, Mother Tereco, starting in September. On September 2, 2015, the band released Vocal Code, an album centered around the theme of "voice." It featured collaborations with various artists, including Tavito Nanao. The album was chosen as the theme for the Nippon TV show News Every and aired for three months that year. In October 2016, they performed at TEAC Corporation's warehouse following the company's announcement of two new concept audio models of CD player amplifiers.

By 2018, they had innovated new methods for utilizing tape recorders, including programming sounds directly onto them, toggling individual tracks, and even employing bamboo sticks for playing. In June of that year, they received an honorary mention at Ars Electronica and were honored with the Starts Prize, recognizing their work at the intersection of science, technology, and art. The following year, the band unveiled a multimedia project accompanied by a video, marking their first international distribution. On March 25, 2022, the Open Reel Ensemble launched a digital book alongside the song "Magnetik Phunk," followed by a live streamed performance at Ginza Sony Park on March 27.

== Genre ==
The band's use of tape loops and hybrid "analog contraptions" with digital effects defies conventional genres. They call themselves "Magnetikpunk".

== Band members ==
Current members

- Ei Wada – reels, programming, composition (2009–present)
- Haruka Yoshida – reels, percussion (2009–present)
- Masaru Yoshida – reels, bass (2009–present)

Former members

- Kimitoshi Sato – reels, DJ, composition (2009–2015)
- Takumi Namba – reels, violin (2009–2015)

== Discography ==
- Open Reel Ensemble (2012)
- Tape and Cloth (2013)
- Vocal Code (2015)

== See also ==
- Electronicos Fantasticos!
