= Yakushimaru =

Yakushimaru is a Japanese surname. Notable people with the surname include:

- Etsuko Yakushimaru (やくしまる えつこ), Japanese singer
- Hiroko Yakushimaru (薬師丸 ひろ子, born 1964), Japanese singer and actress

== See also ==
- 8940 Yakushimaru, main-belt asteroid
