= Async – Remodels =

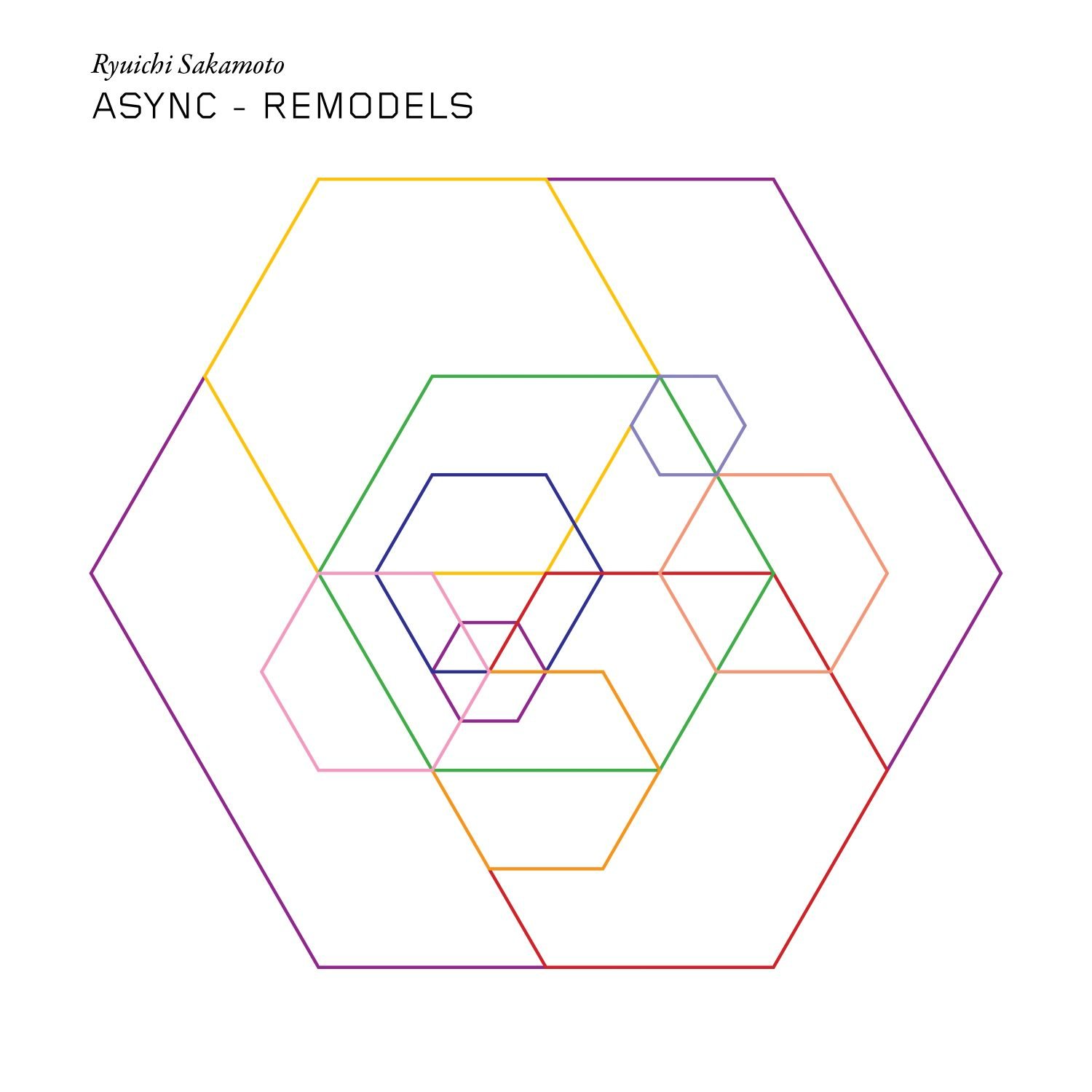

Remix album by Ryuichi Sakamoto
- Released: December 13, 2017
- Length: 53:56
- Labels: Commmons; Milan
- Producer: Various (see track listing)

Ryuichi Sakamoto chronology
async (2017)	Async – Remodels (2017)	Glass (2018)

Singles from Async – Remodels
- 1. "andata (Oneohtrix Point Never rework)" Released: July 25, 2017; 2. "andata (Electric Youth remix)" Released: August 9, 2017; 3. "disintegration (Alva Noto remodel)" Released: August 25, 2017; 4. "async (Arca remix)" Released: September 8, 2017; 5. "fullmoon (Motion Graphics remix)" Released: September 22, 2017; 6. "solari (Fennesz remix)" Released: October 6, 2017; 7. "solari (Johann Johannsson rework)" Released: October 20, 2017; 8. "ZURE (Yves Tumor obsession edit)" Released: November 5, 2017; 9. "fullmoon (S U R V I V E version)" Released: November 20, 2017; 10. "Life, Life (Andy Stott remodel)" Released: December 1, 2017; 11. "ZURE (Cornelius remix)" Released: December 19, 2017

Async – Remodels (stylized in all caps) is an album of "reconstructions" of tracks from Japanese producer Ryuichi Sakamoto's nineteenth solo studio album async (2017). The album includes eleven reworks (twelve on the Japanese release) by producers such as Jóhann Jóhannsson, Fennesz, Cornelius, Oneohtrix Point Never, Electric Youth, and Arca. Released in Japan in December 2017 by Commmons and in February 2018 in other countries by Milan Records, Async – Remodels garnered generally positive critical reviews and peaked at number 15 on the Billboard American Top Classical Albums chart.

== Background ==
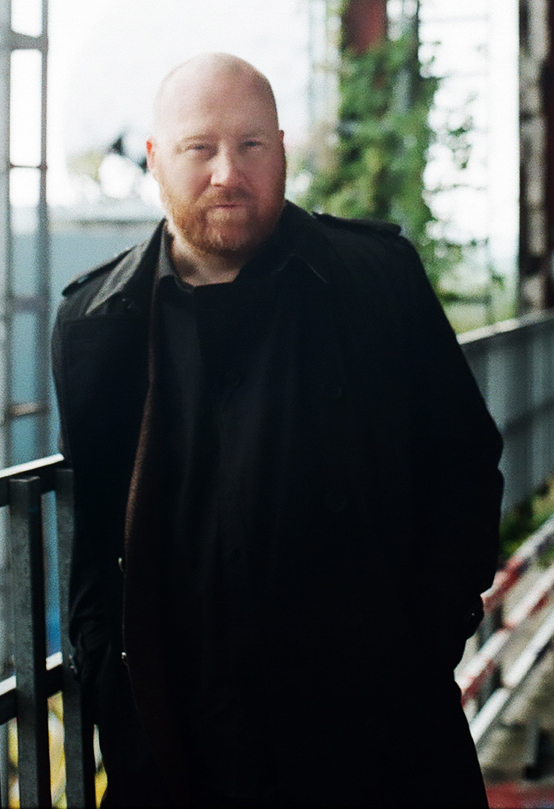
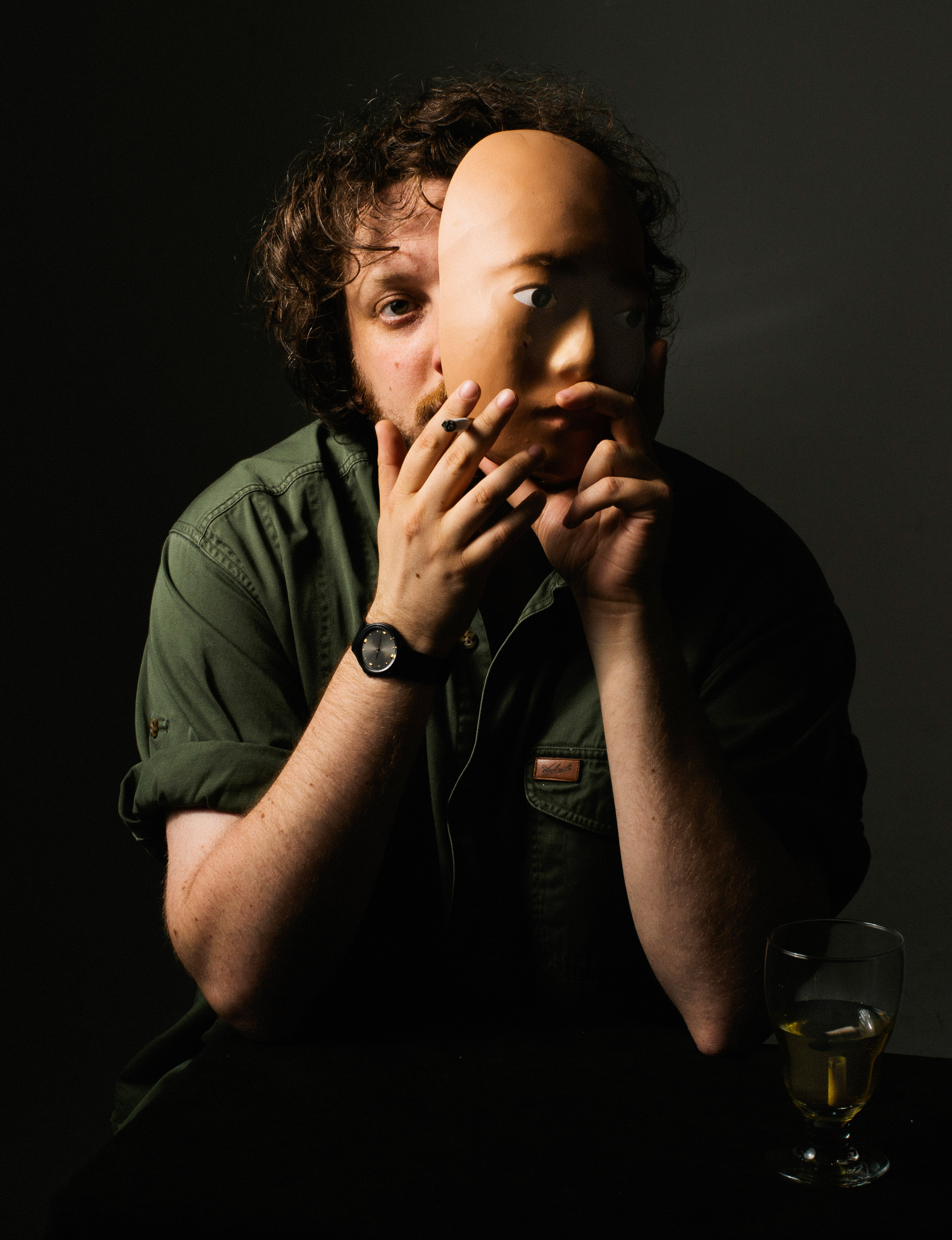
Producers such as Jóhann Jóhannsson (left), and Oneohtrix Point Never (right) created remixes of songs from async (2017).

In terms of the producers that contributed remixes to Async – Remodels, Electric Youth, Motion Graphics, and S U R V I V E were suggested by the label Milan Records. Some of them were musicians Sakamoto was a fan of for a long time, including Oneohtrix Point Never, Arca, Yves Tumor, and Andy Stott. Other contributors included friends and previous collaborators with Sakamoto, including Alva Noto, Fennesz, Jóhann Jóhannsson, and Cornelius. Jóhannsson's reworking of "solari" was done as part of a "remix exchange" where Sakamoto also contributed a remix of one of Jóhannsson's songs for a remix album Jóhannsson was also working on. Arca and Yves Tumor also added their own vocals to their respective remixes.

== Composition ==
The tracks on Async – Remodels aren't remixes per se but rather "reconstructions" of music from async (2017) with only some parts sampled from the album. Some of the tracks, such as the remixes of "andata" by Electric Youth and Oneohtrix Point Never, make rhythmic versions out of the otherwise arrhythmic source material and also exaggerate certain melodies from it. Oneohtrix Point Never's remix is a calmer version of the original track, mainly driven by a piano performing the melody with synthesized plucks and, in the track's most intense moment, buzzing sounds surrounding it. Sakamoto described Electric Youth's Italo disco remix of "andata" as similar to his work with Yellow Magic Orchestra. Yves Tumor's remix of "ZURE" adds saxophone, a slow drum beat, a vocal line, and whisper sounds to the piece's instrumentation.

Other cuts, such as the Alva Noto remodel of "disintegration," Fennesz's "solari" rework, and Arca's reconstruction of the original album's title track, sound like completely new tracks from the musicians rather than remixes. In fact, when Sakamoto received Arca's remix, "at first I was wondering if I had been sent the wrong track." Fennesz's remix puts the melody of "solari" through a distorted atmosphere, and Alva Noto's reworking of "disintegration" "dilat[es]" the original track's piano plucks "to explore the chilly atmospheres between each note," wrote Andy Beta. More mellow than the original piece, Arca's rework depicts a loop of her singing the phrase "I peel my skin off for you" in Japanese. AllMusic journalist Paul Simpson described it as an "operatic epic filled with steely, trudging beats that sound like a knight in a broken suit of armor crawling across the ground, but never giving up the fight." Few tracks maintain most of the structure of the songs being remixed, including Motion Graphic's "fullmoon" remix.

== Critical reception ==
Professional ratings
Aggregate scores
Source	Rating
Album of the Year	75/100
Metacritic	75/100
Review scores
Source	Rating
All About Jazz	3.5/5 stars
AllMusic	3.5/5 stars
Beat	9/10
Exclaim!	9/10
Gigsoup	71%
Pitchfork	6.3/10
PopMatters	7/10 stars
Resident Advisor	3.8/5
Spectrum Culture	3.25/5
Sputnikmusic	4.3/5

As AllMusic journalist Paul Simpson summarized Async – Remodels, "the collection ultimately ends up feeling like a tribute as well as a remix album, serving to highlight Sakamoto's considerable influence on generations of forward-thinking electronic musicians." PopMatters found it to be "every bit as exploratory and delightfully weird as async," and Exclaim! stated that "Everything works here, in its own unique way." Eoin Hanlon of Australian magazine Beat called it "varied and ambitious," writing it has an "emotional progression that feels as celebratory as it does meditative." The diversity of styles was also praised in a review published in All About Jazz, stating it "represents one of those rare occasions when two dissimilar ingredients give rise to something unforeseeably strange and new." Beta, also praising the album as ambitious and "tak[ing] the biggest risks," honored the remodels as "natural extensions" of async, reasoning that they "all reveal the sizable debt and sonic paternity of Sakamoto on their own music." However, he also found the last three tracks to be the LP's weakest material, reasoning that S U R V I V E's recut "doesn't know what to do beyond adding dramatic synth washes to the original" and Stott's rework was "too light to be memorable." Sputnikmusic claimed, "Remodels at worst does indeed bastardize Sakamoto's intentions, [...] but the willingness to deviate from the original composition – and adding lush vocalizations and beats in their place – is a prime component of what makes [it] more than a simple throwaway remix album."

In a more mixed review, Daniel Martin-McCormick of Pitchfork wrote that Async – Remodels "glitters with aspiration and emotion, and yet rings slightly hollow." He reasoned that the remixes "simply struggle to cohere, or cohere a little too much. Across these mixes there's a surprising uniformity of tone and timbre, a kind of austere grandeur with lots of high end reverb trails, big percussion hits, and a sense of frozen futurism." He also panned the album's lack of female contributors given the number of women in 2018's experimental electronic scene such as Laurel Halo, Holly Herndon, Suzanne Ciani, Fatima Al Qadiri, Elysia Crampton, Nkisi, Pan Daijing, Pharmakon, Jlin, and Stellar OM Source. Daniel Bromfield wrote the album uses the "postmodern hellscape aesthetic" of avant-garde producers on its source material, which "sacrifices a lot of what makes async special, like its innocence and its bittersweet awareness of the transience of life." Alex Shutti of Gigsoup stated it would appeal to listeners of accessible music, but "any listener who has heard the original work can't help but want to return to the original project afterwards."

== Accolades ==
Publication	Accolade	Rank	Ref.
The Vinyl Factory	Favourite Digital Releases of 2017 that Should Be Pressed on Vinyl	—N/a	

== Track listing ==
Async – Remodels – Standard version
No.	Title	Remodeled by	Length
1.	"andata"	Oneohtrix Point Never	4:19
2.	"andata"	Electric Youth	5:50
3.	"disintegration"	Alva Noto	5:24
4.	"async"	ARCA	3:42
5.	"fullmoon"	Motion Graphics	3:57
6.	"solari"	Fennesz	4:11
7.	"solari"	Jóhann Jóhannsson	6:31
8.	"ZURE"	Yves Tumor	5:44
9.	"fullmoon"	S U R V I V E	5:12
10.	"ZURE"	Cornelius	3:44
11.	"Life, Life"	Andy Stott	5:52
Total length:			53:56

Async – Remodels – Japanese edition bonus track
No.	Title	Remodeled by	Length
12.	"ZURE"	Kukangendai	4:32
Total length:			58:28

== Release history ==
Region	Date	Format(s)	Label
Japan	December 13, 2017	CD; digital download; vinyl	Commmons
Worldwide	February 16, 2018	CD; digital download	Milan
Worldwide	March 2, 2018	Vinyl	Milan

== Charts ==
Chart (2018)	Peak position
Belgian Albums (Ultratop Flanders)	195
US Top Classical Albums (Billboard)	15
