= Ei Wada =

Japanese singer-songwriter (born 1987)

Ei Wada 和田 永
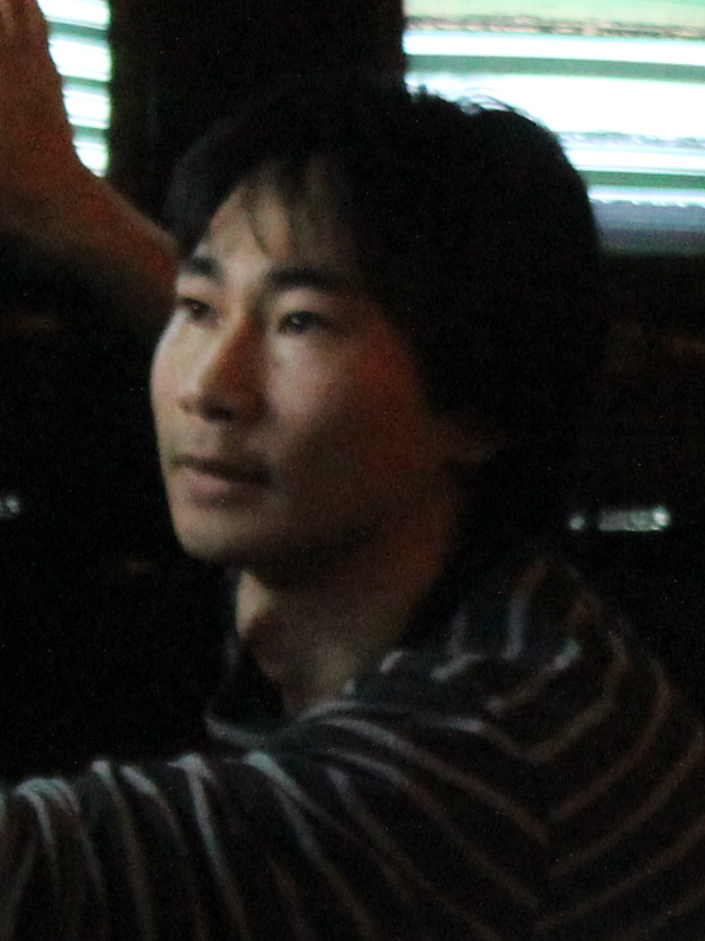
- Wada in 2011

Background information
- Born: 1987 (age 38–39); Tokyo, Japan
- Instruments: Open-reel recordings; electric appliances; CRT television
- Years active: 2009–present
- Member of: Braun Tube Jazz Band; Open Reel Ensemble; Electronicos Fantasticos!
- Website: eiwada.com
- Education: Tama Art University

Ei Wada (和田 永, Wada Ei; born 1987) is a Japanese programmer, artist and musician known for his work in repurposing old electronic appliances into musical instruments. He is the member and founder of projects such as Open Reel Ensemble, Braun Tube Jazz Band, and Electronicos Fantasticos! Besides his musical activities, he is also a visual artist, creating the work "Toki Ori Ori Nasu (Falling Records)" using open-reel tape recorders.

Having been interested in music since childhood, Ei Wada began experimenting with unconventional ways of using electronics as instruments after an accident with a pair of tape recorders as a teenager. He formed the Open Reel Ensemble with university friends to explore the use tape recorders. Later, he created the Braun Tube Jazz Band to experiment with CRT televisions as percussion instruments. He eventually established Electronicos Fantasticos! to collaborate with other musicians across Japan, experimenting with various electronic devices.

== Early life and education ==
Ei Wada was born in Tokyo in 1987. From a young age, he had interest in music and actively engaged with it as a student. At the age of four, Wada's family went to a holiday vacation to Indonesia, where he witnessed a Gamelan music performance, which made him interested in music. He pursued his education at Wako Junior and Senior High School before enrolling at Keio University. Later, he transferred to Tama Art University, where he graduated from.

As a teenager, he received a pair of tape recorders from a friend of his father, who worked at a radio station. One day, while handling them, he accidentally tripped and attempted to fix the reels with his hands. He noticed a change in the sound, realizing that manipulating the reels could turn them into musical instruments. He became friends with Haruka Yoshida, Masaru Yoshida, Kimitoshi Sato, and Takumi Mamba as they attended junior high and high school together. The group would gather at Wada's home, where he played the reel-to-reel in front of them.

== Career ==
=== Open Reel Ensemble ===
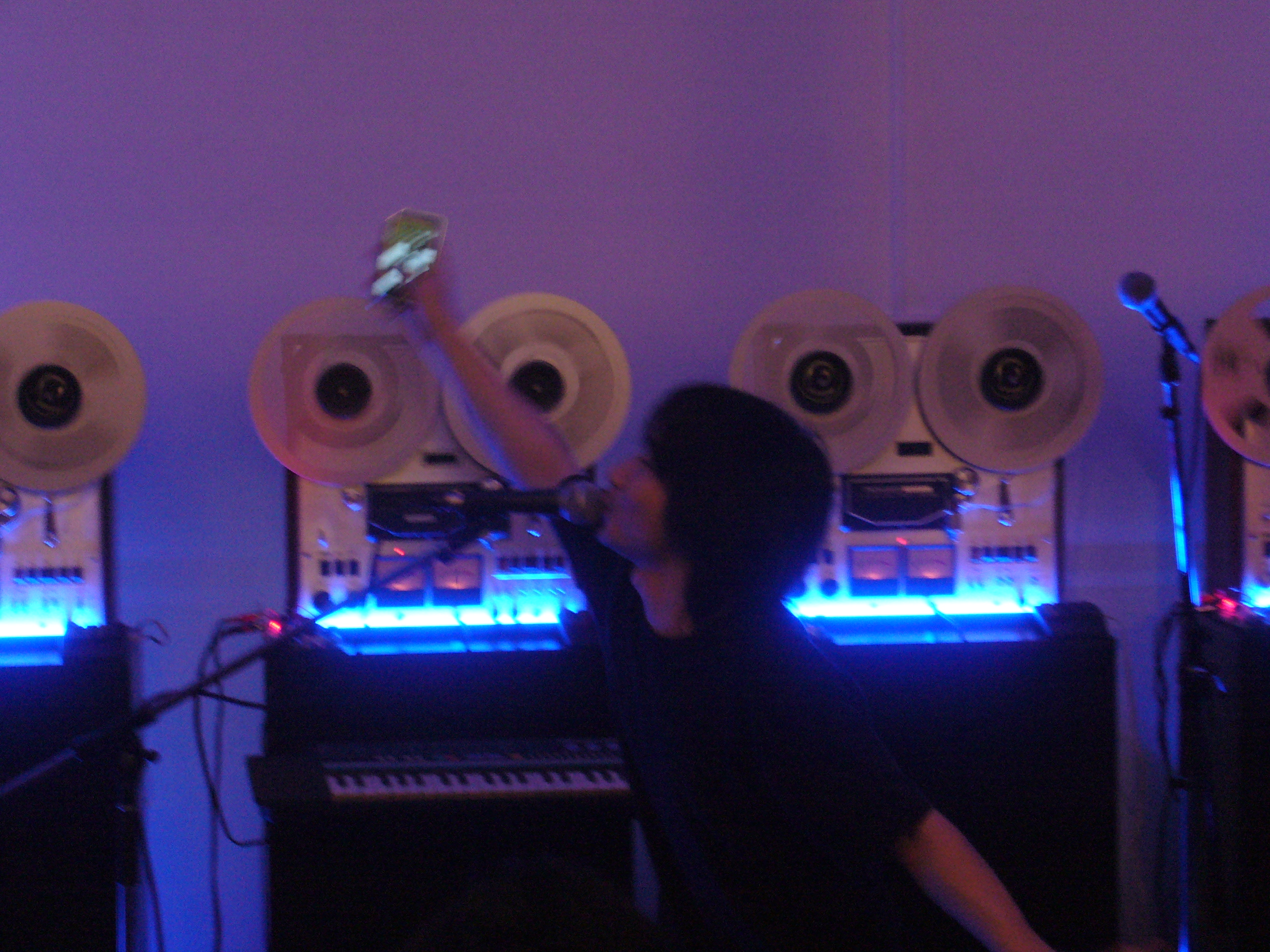
Wada performing with Open Reel Ensemble in 2009

While in university, Wada studied programming but continued to experiment with using reels as instruments. During university, Wada received an assignment for a performance presentation with a group. To brainstorm ideas for the performance, Wada brought the reel-to-reel machine, and the group began experimenting with it, connecting the open reel to a computer and cutting wires. This project ultimately led to the formation of the Open Reel Ensemble among the five members in 2009. They won the Excellence Award in the Student CG Contest Interactive Division of the Japan Media Arts Festival that year. Their performances at NTT InterCommunication Center and Ars Electronica garnered attention, prompting them to transition from a purely visual project to a combined visual and audio one.

On June 27, 2012, they released their first album, Open Reel Ensemble, featuring collaborations with artists such as Yukihiro Takahashi, Etsuko Yakushimaru, Money Mark, and Gota Yashiki. Their second album, Tape and Cloth, followed in 2013. Despite two members leaving in 2015, they continued to experiment with their third album, Vocal Code, exploring new ways to use tape recorders. By 2018, they were recognized at Ars Electronica and awarded the Starts Prize for combining science, technology, and art. In 2022, they released a digital book and new song, "Magnetik Phunk," and streamed a live performance at Ginza Sony Park.

=== Braun Tube Jazz Band and Electronicos Fantasticos! ===
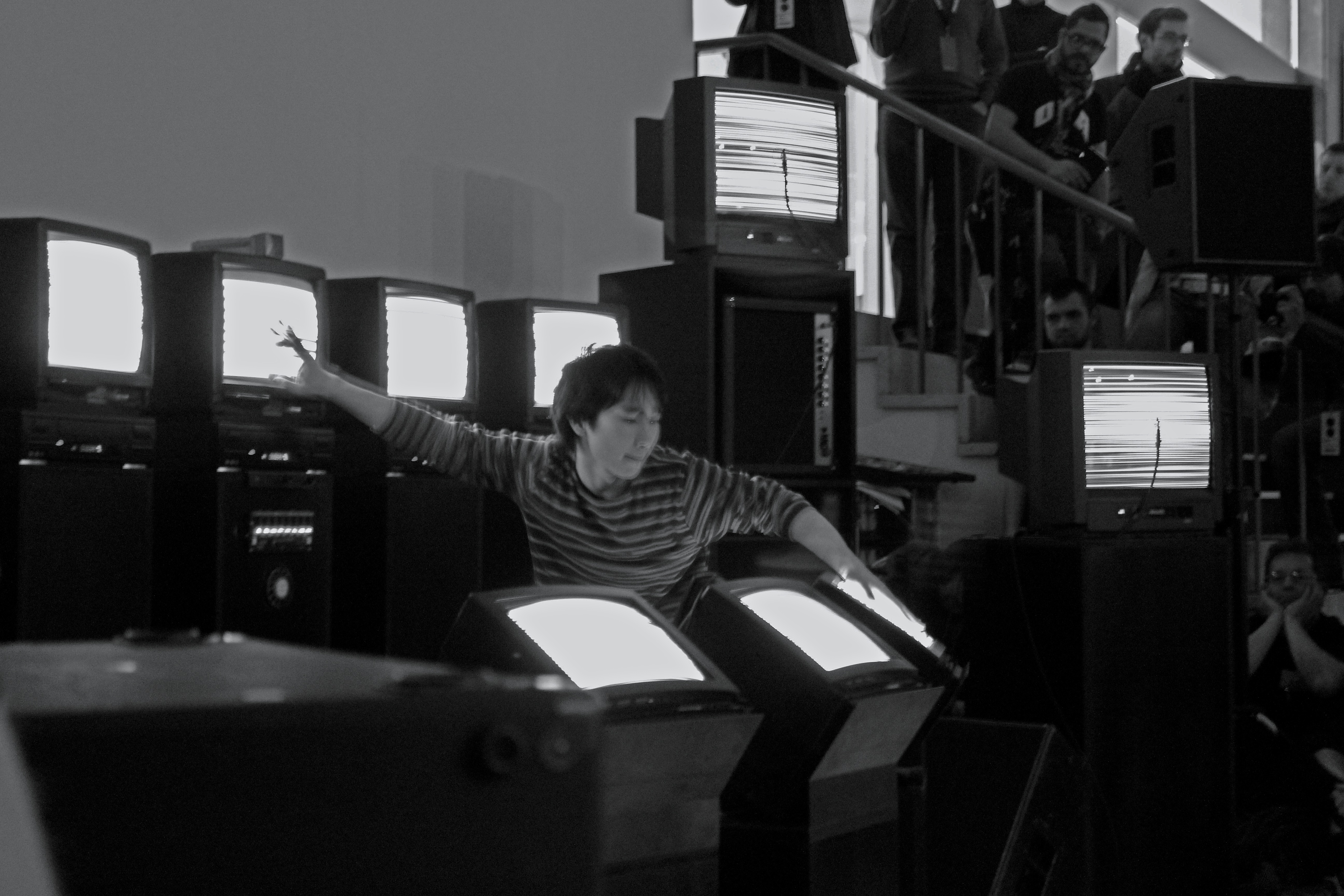
Wada performing as the Braun Tube Jazz Band in 2011

While still part of the Open Reel Ensemble, Wada saw the eventual scarcity of obsolete tape for their recorders. To address this, he began experimenting with other old technologies. He discovered the potential of CRT television as instruments when he plugged a sound cable into a composite video connector port and saw the sound being displayed as an image on the screen. This inspired Wada to create the Braun Tube Jazz Band project in 2010.

In early 2015, Wada started Electronicos Fantasticos! as a resident art project, as well as establishing the Nicos Orchest-Lab collaborative team by end of the year. Their goal was to form an orchestra using recycled devices, not just for passive listening but for interactive engagement, allowing people to interact directly with the instruments. Wada opted to name the group in Spanish, finding it more aesthetically pleasing than Japanese. The group transforms locally sourced CRT TVs and electric fans into musical instruments. Over 70 members have joined the project, including engineers, designers, musicians, and management.

In November 2017, the group organized the Electro-Magnetic Bon-Dance under Tokyo Tower, and by March 2018, their efforts earned recognition with the Ministry of Education, Culture, Sports, Science and Technology's New Artist Award in the Media Arts category of the Arts Encouragement Prize. They also received an honorary mention at Ars Electronica in the Interactive Arts category and the Starts Prize for their fusion of science, technology, and art. That year, they integrated barcode readers into their performances, including creating a striped dress to use.

== Other activities ==
=== Visual art ===
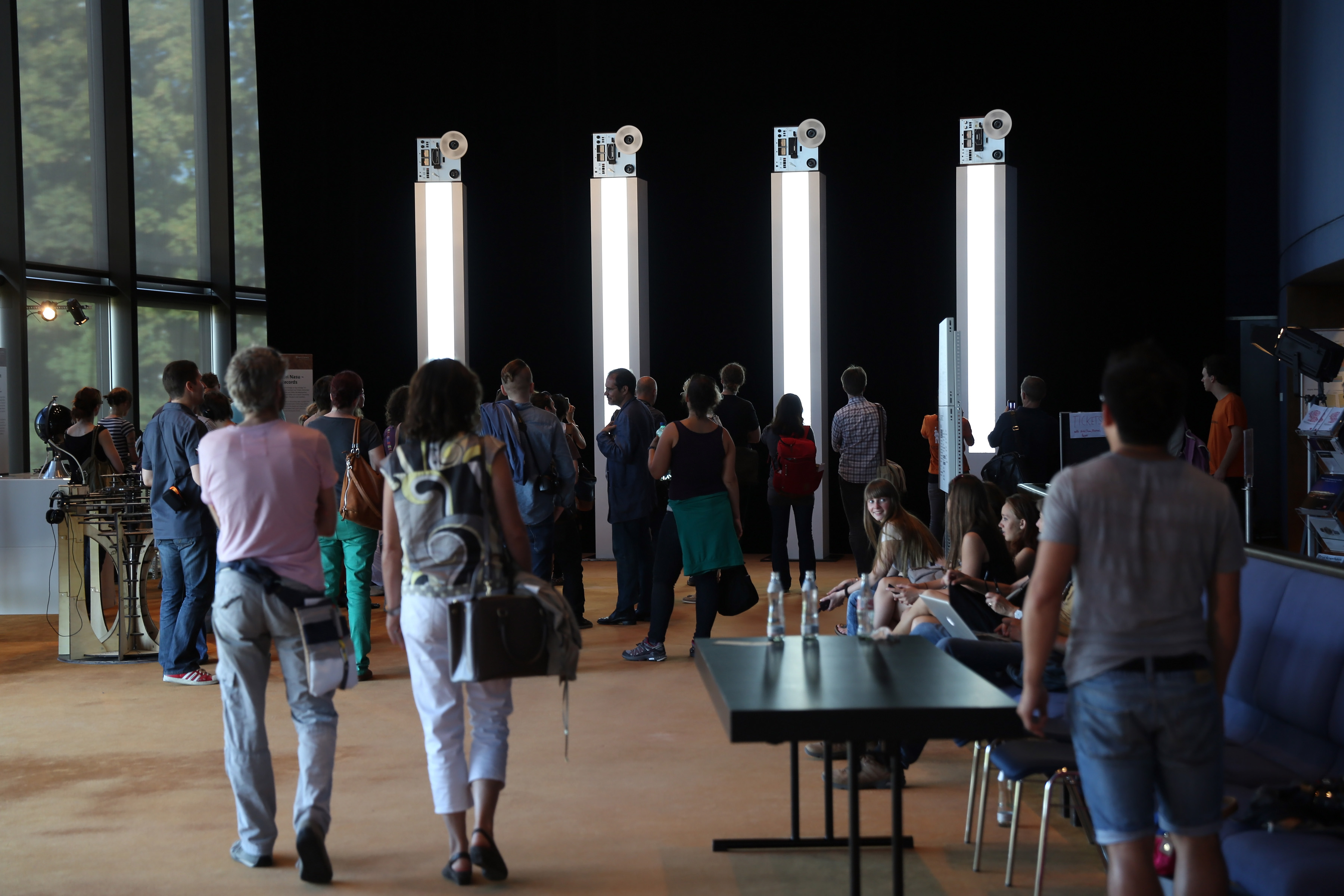
Wada's "Toki Ori Ori Nasu (Falling Records)" at Ars Electronica Festival 2013

Wada is also a visual artist. In 2014, he debuted the installation at the Japan Media Arts Festival, which Gizmodo described as "beautiful and mesmerizing—and a bit sad, too. After all, cassette culture is surrounded by nostalgia and fetishism." That same year, Wada created an installation titled Flying Balloons, featuring helium balloons attached to six magnetic tapes, each with different voice pitches recorded on them, as part of his work with Open Reel Ensemble.
