= STARTS Prize =

- Awarded for: Innovative projects at the interface of science, technology and art
- Sponsored by: European Commission
- Date: 2016
- Location: Linz
- Country: Austria
- Presented by: European Commission; Ars Electronica; BOZAR; Waag Society
- Winner(s): Artificial Skins and Bones; Iris van Herpen
- Website: starts-prize.aec.at

The STARTS Prize is the grand prize of the European Commission that honors projects that demonstrate the successful integration of science, technology and art to contribute to social and economic innovation.

Two grand prize winners and up to ten honorary mentions are selected by an international jury each year. One grand prize is awarded for innovative collaboration between industry or technology and the arts that open new pathways for innovation. A second grand prize is awarded for artistic exploration and art works where appropriation by the arts has a strong potential to influence or alter the use, deployment or perception of technology. The prize is funded under Horizon 2020 and is awarded on behalf of the European Commission, Ars Electronica in collaboration with BOZAR and Waag Society.

== Winners and honorary mentions ==
Year	Prize for Innovative Collaboration	Prize for Artistic Exploration	Honorary Mentions
2018	Amsterdam’s 3D Printed Steel Bridge - MX3D and Joris Laarman Lab	Future Flora – Giulia Tomasello	The Institute of Isolation – Lucy McRae; phosphere – Rhizomatiks Research, ELEVENPLAY, evala, Takayuki Fujimoto (Kinsei R&D); Fennec Turbine – Maxim Kuzin, ATOM; BLITAB – the innovative tablet for the blind – Kristina Tsvetanova, Slavi Slavev / BLITAB Technology GmbH; Shadertoy – Pol Jeremias Vila, Iñigo Quilez / Beautypi; Making Sense – Citizen Sensing Toolkit – Making Sense Team; ELECTRONICOS FANTASTICOS! – Ei Wada + Nicos Orchest-Lab; 489 Years – Hayoun Kwon; Printed Paper Actuator – Morphing Matter Lab at Carnegie Mellon University; FluidSolids – FluidSolids® AG
2017	Rock Print – Gramazio Kohler Research, ETH Zurich and Self-Assembly Lab, MIT	I'm Humanity – Etsuko Yakushimaru	3arabizi Keyboard – Hadeer Omar; Blink: Humanising Autonomy – Adam Bernstein, Raunaq Bose, Leslie Nooteboom, Maya Pindeus; [IGNIS AER AQUA TERRA] – Yuima Nakazato; Library of Ourselves – BeAnotherLab; Mimus: Coming face-to-face with our companion species – Madeline Gannon; nonvisual-art – Lisa Buttinger; Out of Exile – Nonny de la Peña, Emblematic Group; Research Institute for Arts and Technology; Sentient Veil – Philip Beesley; Treelab – Marcus Maeder, Roman Zweifel
2016	Artificial Skins and Bones – Artificial Skins and Bones Group	Magnetic Motion - Iris van Herpen	Amsterdam Smart Citizens Lab – Waag Society; Bionic Partition: Generative Design for Aerospace – Airbus, APWorks, Autodesk, The Living; Fairy Lights in Femtoseconds - Yoichi Ochiai; RGB|CMYK KINETIC – ART+COM Studios; SPARKED: A Live Interaction Between Humans and Quadcopters – Verity Studios, ETH Zurich and Cirque du Soleil; unfold - Ryoichi Kurokawa; V2_, Institute for the Unstable Media; Water-based Digital Fabrication Platform – Mediated Matter Research Group, MIT Media Lab; WCMC Discover Wall – Squint/Opera and Hirsch & Mann; We Make Money Not Art
