= Sōtaisei Riron =

Japanese rock band

Soutaiseiriron
- Origin: Tokyo, Japan
- Genres: Kayōkyoku, J-pop, pop rock, Twee pop
- Years active: 2006–present
- Labels: Mirai records, commmons
- Members: Etsuko Yakushimaru; Seiichi Nagai; Masaru Yoshida; Motoki Yamaguchi
- Past members: Shūichi Mabe; Kensuke Nishiura; Itoken
- Website: mirairecords.com/stsr/

Sōtaisei Riron (相対性理論; lit. "Theory of Relativity") is a Japanese rock band formed in Tokyo in September 2006.

== Summary ==
The band consists of Etsuko Yakushimaru (lead vocals, producer, original instruments, artwork), Seiichi Nagai (guitar), Masaru Yoshida (bass), Motoki Yamaguchi (drums). The band is known for not revealing much about their private lives. Media coverage concerning the band is minimal and taking photos during live occasions is strictly forbidden. The band derives its influences from genres such as kayōkyoku, group sounds and post-rock. Song titles as well as lyrics often involve plays on words and pop culture references. According to guitarist Seiichi Nagai, the band composes most of their music together.

The debut mini-album, Chiffon Capitalism, was the winner of the 1st All Japan CD Shop Award, and their second album, Hi-Fi Shinsho, ranked No. 7 in the Oricon weekly chart.

The third album, Synchroniciteen, was released in April 2010. The album consists of both all-new songs and songs already performed live during numerous live events.

The fourth album, Tadashii Sōtaisei Riron, had a planned release date of March 23, 2011. However, it was postponed due to the 2011 Tōhoku earthquake and tsunami and was finally released on April 27, 2011. Tadashii Sōtaisei Riron is a remix album with three new songs and a total of ten remixes of already released Sōtaisei Riron songs. (Remixed by Matthew Herbert, Fennesz, Arto Lindsay, Ryuichi Sakamoto, Cornelius (musician) and more)

The fifth album, TOWN AGE, was released in July 2013. After the release of the album, a concert with My Bloody Valentine (band) was also held in Tokyo International Forum.

"Spectrum"(as '''Sōtaisei Riron x Jeff Mills''') and "Tama Tama Newtown (2DK session)" were released on 2015.

The sixth album, Tensei Jingle, was released in April 2016. The album received praise from figures including Ryuichi Sakamoto, Jeff Mills, Penguin Cafe, and Kiyoshi Kurosawa.

NEO-FUTURE, a single, was released in October 2018. A live album Shiraberu Sōtaisei Riron was released in July 2019.

== Band members ==
- Etsuko Yakushimaru (やくしまる えつこ, Yakushimaru Etsuko) – lead vocals, producer, dimtakt (original instruments), artwork

Yakushimaru is an artist, musician, producer, lyricist, composer, arranger, and vocalist. Broadly active, from pop music to experimental music and art. Consistently independent in her wide-ranging activities, which also include drawing, installation art, media art, poetry and other literature, and recitation. Producing numerous projects and artists, including her band, Soutaiseiriron. While appearing in the music charts with many hit songs, she has also created a project that involved the use of satellite, biological data and biotechnology, a song-generating robot powered by artificial intelligence and her own voice, an independently-developed VR system, and original electronic musical instruments. Major recent activities include exhibitions at Mori Art Museum, Toyota Municipal Museum of Art, KENPOKU ART 2016, and Yamaguchi Center for Arts and Media [YCAM]. Her Tensei Jingle and Flying Tentacles albums, both released in 2016, received praise from figures including Ryuichi Sakamoto, Jeff Mills, Fennesz, Penguin Cafe, Kiyoshi Kurosawa and Toh EnJoe. She uses the alias Tica·α (ティカ・α, Tika arufa) in songwriting and composition work. Yakushimaru is an Ars Electronica STARTS Prize 2017 Grand prize winner.

- Seiichi Nagai (永井 聖一, Nagai Seiichi) – guitar
- Masaru Yoshida (吉田 匡, Yoshida Masaru) – bass
- Motoki Yamaguchi (山口 元輝, Yamaguchi Motoki) – drums

Past members

- Itoken (イトケン, Itoken) – keyboard, percussion
- Shūichi Mabe (真部 脩一, Mabe Shūichi) – bass (went on to form the band Shudan Kojo)
- Kensuke Nishiura (西浦 謙助, Nishiura Kensuke) – drums (went on to form the band Shudan Kojo)

Nishiura is also active in the bands Luminous Orange and Mass of the Fermenting Dregs as a support drummer.

== Discography ==
Studio albums

- Hi-Fi Shinsho (or Hi-Fi Anatomia) (2009)
- Synchroniciteen (2010)
- TOWN AGE (2013)
- Tensei Jingle (2016)

EPs

- Chiffon Shugi (2008)

Remix albums

- Tadashii Sōtaisei Riron (2011)

Live albums

- Shiraberu Sōtaisei Riron (2019)

Collaboration singles

- "Our Music" (2010) (as Sōtaisei Riron & Keiichirō Shibuya)
- "Ranbō to Taiki" (2010) (as Sōtaisei Riron & Yoshio Ōtani)

Singles

- "YOU & IDOL / KIds No Return” (single ver.) (2013)
- "Spectrum" (2015) (as Sōtaisei Riron x Jeff Mills)
- "Tama Tama Newtown (2DK session)" (2015)
- "Ultra Soda" (2015)
- "NEO-FUTURE" (2018)
