= Electronicos Fantasticos! =

Electronicos Fantasticos! エレクトロニコス・ファンタスティコス!
- Also known as: Nicos (ニコス)
- Origin: Tokyo, Japan
- Years active: 2015–present
- Labels: Sony Music Entertainment Japan; VINYLSOYUZ; Topping East
- Website: www.electronicosfantasticos.com

Electronicos Fantasticos! (Japanese: エレクトロニコス・ファンタスティコス!, Hepburn: Erekutoronikosu Fantasutikosu!) is a Japanese music project led by Ei Wada, known for their use of recycled electronics, such as electric fans, CRT televisions, and barcode readers, as electronic instruments. One of Wada's projects involving unconventional instruments, the project was formed in 2015 alongside the Nocos Orchestra-Lab to help with people interested in producing music using electronic items.

== History ==
The project was started in early 2015 by musician Ei Wada as a resident art project, leading to the formation of the Nicos Orchest-Lab collaborative team by the end of the year. The aim was to create an orchestra using recycled devices, not only for listening and watching but also for engaging with people and allowing them to interact with the instruments. Wada decided to name the group in Spanish, believing it sounded better than Japanese. In 2016, they participated in the Kenpoku Art Ibaraki Kita Art Festival with a team set up in Hitachi that tuned locally collected CRT TVs and electric fans into musical instruments.

In November 2017, the group organized the Electro-Magnetic Bon-Dance under Tokyo Tower. This event was initially intended as a memorial to the deceased but also extended to commemorate electronics that played a significant role in Japan's economic growth, particularly those manufactured by Japanese brands like Toshiba, Sony, and Panasonic until the 1990s. In March 2018, the project received the Ministry of Education, Culture, Sports, Science and Technology's New Artist Award in the Media Arts category of the Arts Encouragement Prize. Additionally, at that year's Ars Electronica, they were awarded an honorary mention in the Interactive Arts category and the Starts Prize, which recognizes works that combine science, technology, and art. That same year, they began incorporating barcode readers into their work, including using a dress with music encoded in a striped design and a barcode guitar instead of traditional guitar strings.

== Artistry ==
The group uses various recycled electronics as instruments, incorporating different electronic components. A circuit board on the neck of the guitar can modulate the frequency of the CRT screen, altering the sound produced by the scanner. This interaction causes the scanner to react to the screen, generating a digital signal. Their fan guitars operate in a similar manner, where the movement of the fans modulates the sound produced. The Nicos Orchest-Lab team has created numerous modified electronic instruments, giving them names like the CRTelecaster, Telelele, and TV O-daiko. The group has also conducted experiments using barcodes and similar patterns with a barcode scanner. Additionally, they have explored creating clothing, such as a dress featuring patterns resembling a barcode, which they call the Barcodress.

Their genre has been described as "barcode techno" and as a "multimedia EDM show" as many members and participants of the group come from various places. Wada himself rejects the cyberpunk label for the group, preferring to call their style "electromagnetic punk," emphasizing that their instruments come from a time when electromagnetic technologies were increasing.

== Discography ==
=== Collaborations ===
- Charanga (as m-flo loves ELECTRONICOS FANTASTICOS!) (from M-Flo's album "Superliminal", 2026)

== Members ==
As a project, the group does not have a fixed number of members. Over 70 individuals from various fields, including engineers, designers, musicians, and management, have joined. The group is spread across cities such as Tokyo, Kyoto, Hitachi, and Nagoya. They share ideas and expertise, construct their own instruments, and engage in improvisational sessions.

== See also ==
- Open Reel Ensemble
