= Etsuko Yakushimaru =

Etsuko Yakushimaru やくしまる えつこ
- Born: June 3, 1987 (age 37)
- Genres: Pop, ambient, experimental
- Years active: 2006–present
- Labels: Mirai Records, King, Commmons
- Member of: Sōtaisei Riron
- Website: yakushimaruetsuko.com

Etsuko Yakushimaru (やくしまる えつこ, Yakushimaru Etsuko) is a Japanese singer, producer, composer, lyricist, arranger and artist. She is broadly active, from pop music to experimental music and art. Her output has also included drawing, installation art, media art, poetry and other literature, and recitation. She also produces numerous projects and for artists, including her band, Sōtaisei Riron. Along with appearing in the Oricon charts with several hit songs, she has also created a project that involved the use of satellite, biological data and biotechnology, a song-generating robot powered by artificial intelligence and her own voice, an independently-developed VR system, and original electronic musical instruments. Major recent activities include exhibitions at Mori Art Museum, Toyota Municipal Museum of Art, KENPOKU ART 2016, and Yamaguchi Center for Arts and Media [YCAM]. Her Tensei Jingle and Flying Tentacles albums, both released in 2016, received praise from figures including Ryuichi Sakamoto, Jeff Mills, Fennesz, Penguin Cafe, Kiyoshi Kurosawa and Toh EnJoe. She is known for her solo works including theme songs in several anime series, such as The Tatami Galaxy, Arakawa Under The Bridge, Space Dandy, Sailor Moon Crystal, Hi Score Girl, Eureka Seven and Mawaru Penguindrum. As well as being the lead vocal of the rock band Sōtaisei Riron, she also works as a contemporary artist, illustrator and narrator. She also goes by the alias of Tica α (ティカ・α) when credited for lyrics and composing. In 2017 she won the STARTS Prize for Artistic Exploration for converting her pop song I’m Humanity into DNA.

== Discography ==
=== Studio albums ===
- Blu-Day (2010) (as Etsuko Yakushimaru & D.V.D)
- Radio Onsen Eutopia (2013)
- Flying Tentacles (2016) (as Yakushimaru Experiment)

=== Singles ===
2009

- Oyasumi Paradox
- Jenny wa Gokigen Naname

2010

- Venus to Jesus
- Kamisama no Iutōri (as Junji Ishiwatari, Yoshinori Sunahara & Etsuko Yakushimaru)
- Cosmos vs Alien

2011

- Adaptation 05.1 - eyrs ~ Adaptation 05.2 Ballet Mécanique - eyrs (as Ryuichi Sakamoto & Etsuko Yakushimaru)
- Lulu/Tokimeki Hacker
- Nornir/Shōnen yo Ware ni Kaere (as Etsuko Yakushimaru Metro Orchestra)

2012

- Kiri Kiri Mai
- Yami Yami
- Lonely Planet

2013

- Shōnen yo Ware ni Kaere (Radio Onsen Eutopia version)

2014

- Welcome to the X Dimension (X次元へようこそ X Jigen e Yōkoso)/Absolute Monsieur
- Chia・Chia (チア・チア)

2016

- New moon ni Koishite/eternal eternity (opening and ending for Sailor Moon Crystal Season 3)
- New moon ni Koishite/Zjo sensou (OST for Sailor Moon Crystal Season 3)
- I'm Humanity (Watashi wa Jinrui)

2017

- Flash of Dopamine
- Hige The Cat

2018

- AfterSchoolDi(e)stra(u)ction
- Songs of Atarima Etsuko
- Ballet Mécanique (as Etsuko Yakushimaru & Yoshinori Sunahara )
