= Commmons =

Japanese record label

commmons
- Parent company: Avex Group
- Founded: 2006
- Founder: Ryuichi Sakamoto, Max Matsuura
- Status: Active
- Distributor: Rhythm Zone (via Avex Marketing)
- Genre: J-pop, electropop, new-age
- Country of origin: Japan
- Location: Aoyama, Tokyo
- Official website: https://www.commmons.com

commmons is a Japanese record label founded by Japanese musician Ryuichi Sakamoto. Avex Group, Japan's biggest independent record label, is its official parent company.

== History ==
Commmons was founded in 2006 by Sakamoto with the help of Avex and its founder and president, Max Matsuura. The word commmons has three M's because the third 'M' stands for music. On the initiative's "About" page, the label is described as a project that "aims to find new possibilities for music, while making meaningful contribution to culture and society."

== Distribution ==
It is distributed by Rhythm Zone, Avex's urban and R&B record label, and uses the catalog code "RZCM-4****". It also serves as a distributing label for Thrill Jockey and Raster-Noton in Japan.

== Artists ==
- Aoki Takamasa
- Asa-Chang & Junray
- Boredoms
- Christian Fennesz
- Kotringo
- OOIOO
- Open Reel Ensemble
- Ryuichi Sakamoto (Founder)
- Penguin Cafe Orchestra
- Sōtaisei Riron (Mirai Records/commmons)
- Takeshi Ueda
- Yellow Magic Orchestra

== See also ==
- Avex Group
- List of record labels
