= NTT InterCommunication Center =

Media art gallery in Tokyo, Japan

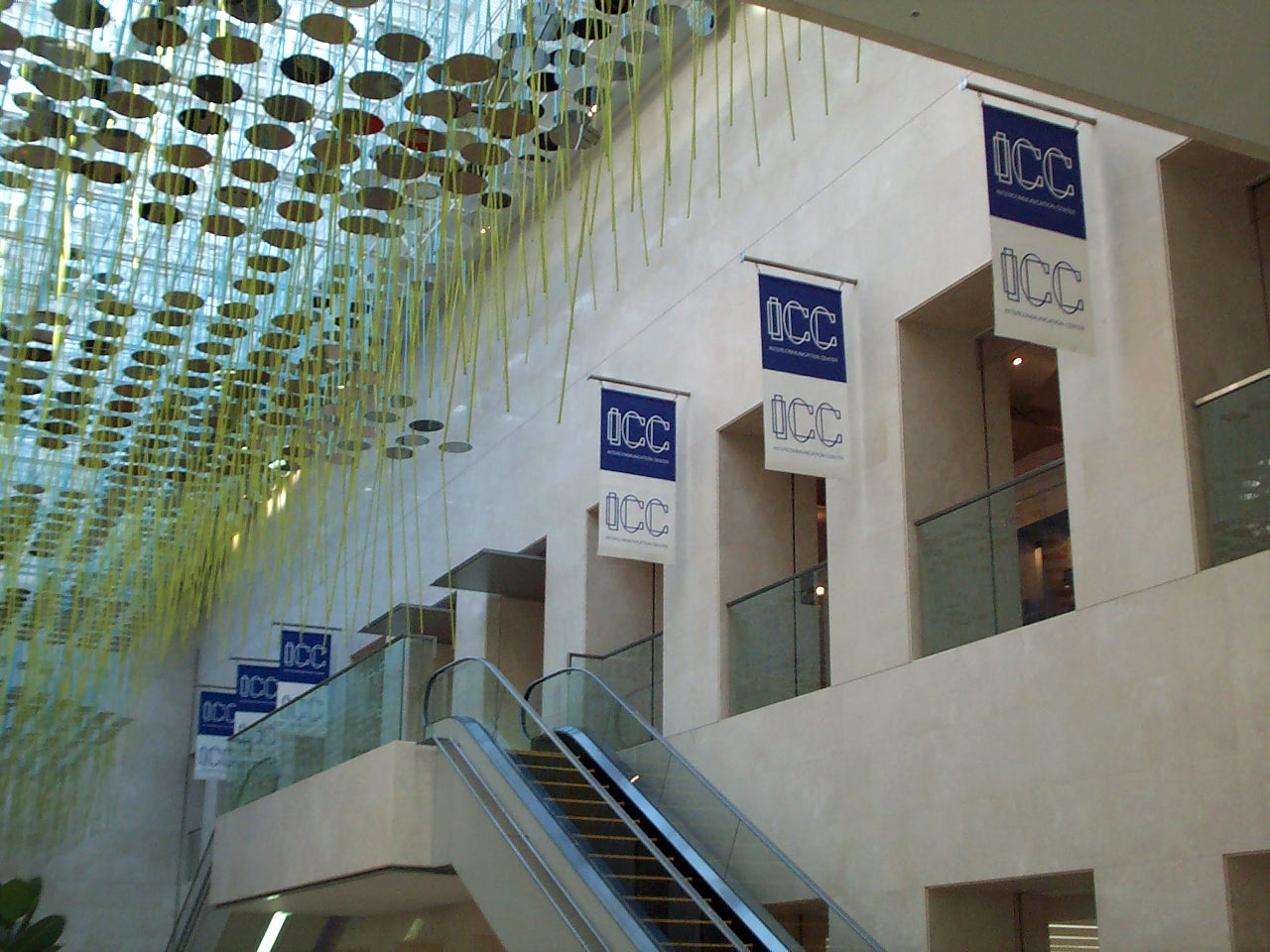
The entrance to the NTT ICC

NTT InterCommunication Center (ICC) is a media art gallery in Tokyo Opera City Tower in Shinjuku, Tokyo, Japan. It was established by NTT to commemorate the 100th anniversary of telephone service in Japan and opened in 1997. In addition to permanent and temporary exhibitions featuring international and Japanese artists, ICC holds workshops, performances, symposia, and produces publications with the goal of advancing communication between artists and scientists.

== Location ==
Tokyo Opera City Tower 4F, 3-20-2 Nishishinjuku, Shinjuku, Tokyo 163-1404 Japan
