= Summvs =

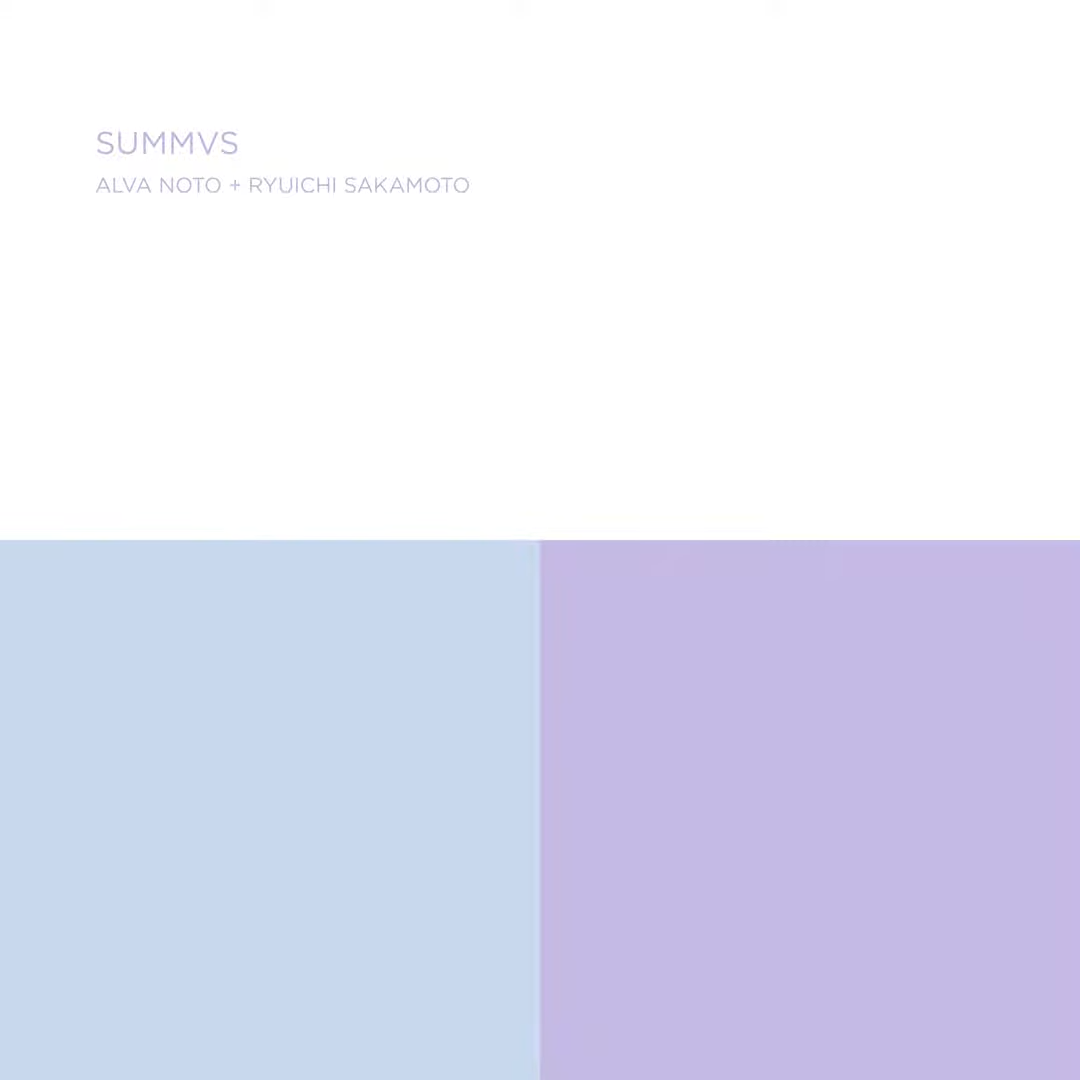

Studio album by Alva Noto, Ryuichi Sakamoto
- Released: 9 May 2011
- Studios: Onkio Haus (Tokyo, Japan), Victor Studio (Tokyo, Japan), and Hansa Studios (Berlin, Germany).
- Genre: Electronic
- Length: 56:35
- Label: Raster-Noton r-n 132

Alva Noto, Ryuichi Sakamoto chronology
utp_ (2008)	Summvs (2011)	"Glass" (2018)

Professional ratings
Review scores
Source	Rating
Igloo Magazine	favourable

Summvs is the fifth collaboration album between Alva Noto and Ryuichi Sakamoto. The record was released on 9 May 2011 via Raster-Noton label.

== Background ==
Summvs is the fifth and final installment in the V.I.R.U.S. series, named for the initial letters of each release in the series: Vrioon (2002), Insen (2005), Revep (2006), utp_ (2008), and Summvs. The title Summvs refers to the Latin word "summa" (eng. sum) and "versus" (eng. towards), a metaphor for the work being oriented towards a collaborative result. The album's three "Microon" compositions utilize a 16th tone interval tuning piano designed by Mexican composer Julián Carrillo. The album also features two covers of the Brian Eno song "By This River", originally composed by Eno, Dieter Moebius, and Hans-Joachim Roedelius in 1977.

== Reception ==
Mark Jarnes of The Japan Times commented "Sakamoto’s haunting piano-based arrangements — as well as his masterful understanding of silence — effortlessly coalesce with Nicolai’s digital rhythms and accompaniment, creating a work of musical art that is as provocative as it is meditative. OK, so technically because this album was pressed by German label Raster-Noton, it’s not strictly a Japanese release. However, Sakamoto’s contribution makes it a significant step forward for Japan’s avant-garde scene — not just musically, but also artistically".

== Track listing ==
No.	Title	Writer(s)	Length
1.	"Microon I"	Carsten Nicolai, Alva Noto, Ryuichi Sakamoto	3:03
2.	"Reverso"	Carsten Nicolai, Alva Noto, Ryuichi Sakamoto	6:57
3.	"Halo"	Carsten Nicolai, Alva Noto, Ryuichi Sakamoto	7:09
4.	"Microon II"	Carsten Nicolai, Alva Noto, Ryuichi Sakamoto	2:37
5.	"Pionier 100"	Carsten Nicolai, Alva Noto, Ryuichi Sakamoto	5:45
6.	"Ionoscan"	Carsten Nicolai, Alva Noto, Ryuichi Sakamoto	4:07
7.	"By This River"	Brian Eno, Dieter Moebius, Carsten Nicolai, Alva Noto, Hans-Joachim Roedelius, Ryuichi Sakamoto	4:07
8.	"Naono"	Carsten Nicolai, Alva Noto, Ryuichi Sakamoto	11:20
9.	"Microon III"	Carsten Nicolai, Alva Noto, Ryuichi Sakamoto	3:00
10.	"By This River: Phantom"	Brian Eno, Dieter Moebius, Carsten Nicolai, Alva Noto, Hans-Joachim Roedelius, Ryuichi Sakamoto	8:30
Total length:			56:35

== Personnel ==
- Grand Piano – Ryuichi Sakamoto
- Music – Alva Noto (tracks: 1 to 6, 8, 9), Ryuichi Sakamoto (tracks: 1 to 6, 8, 9)
- Piano – Conrad Hensel, Fernando Aponte, Yoshifumi Iio
