= Glass (composition) =

Live album of a single composition by Alva Noto & Ryuichi Sakamoto
- Released: February 16, 2018
- Recorded: September 1, 2016
- Studios: Philip Johnson Glass House; New Canaan, Connecticut
- Genre: Ambient
- Length: 36:58
- Label: NOTON
- Producers: Rafael Anton Irisarri; Carsten Nicolai; Ryuichi Sakamoto

Alva Noto & Ryuichi Sakamoto chronology
Summvs (2011)	"Glass" (2018)

Alva Noto chronology
Leaves of Grass (2016)	"Glass" (2018)	Unieqav (2018)

Ryuichi Sakamoto chronology
ASYNC – REMODELS (2017)	"Glass" (2018)

"Glass" is an improvisational piece composed by Ryuichi Sakamoto and Carsten Nicolai, known by his stage name as Alva Noto, for Yayoi Kusama's installation Dots Obsession—Alive, Seeking for Eternal Hope, which ran in September 2016 at Philip Johnson's Glass House. A film of the performance was uploaded to the Glass House's official Vimeo account and website on November 11, 2016, and an audio recording of the 37-minute composition was released as an album on Nicolai's label NOTON on February 16, 2018. "Glass" is an unconventional ambient piece that uses sounds from a keyboard, glass-made singing bowls, and digital processing of the House's glass walls. The composition consists of developing layers of sounds performed over a single drone. It was praised by many professional reviewers as a display of Sakamoto and Nicolai's growing artistry.

== Background ==
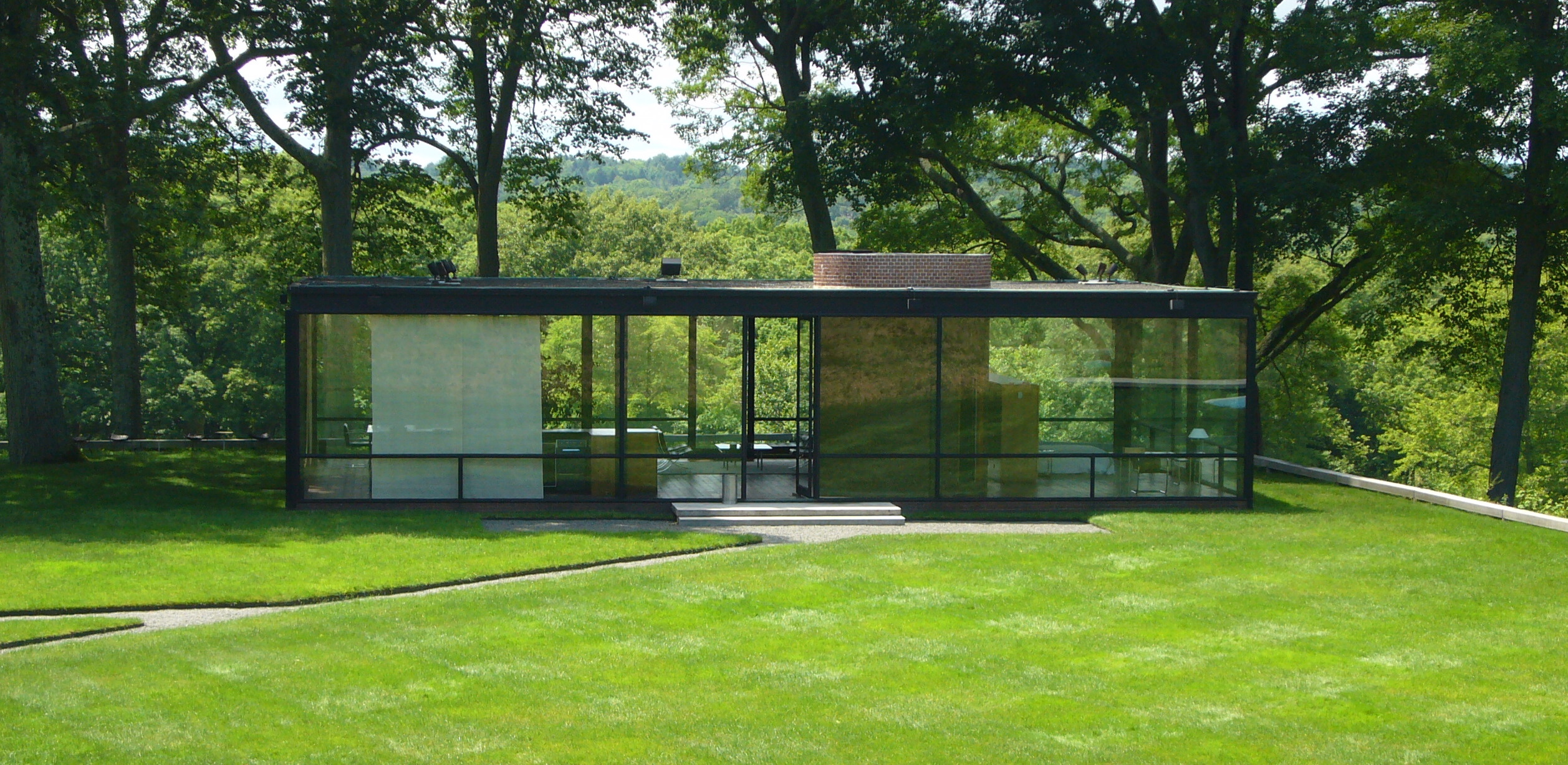
The Glass House in 2009.

Dots Obsession—Alive, Seeking for Eternal Hope was an art installation by Yayoi Kusama that ran at Philip Johnson's Glass House from September 1 to 26, 2016, which involved her covering the walls with "infinity polka dots." The beginning of the installation involved a musical performance by Carsten Nicolai, known by his stage name as Alva Noto, and Ryuichi Sakamoto. The improvised performance, rehearsed in only one day, involved using a keyboard, mixing consoles, singing bowls made out of glass, crotales, and gong mallets rubbed softly against the glass walls. It was engineered and recorded by Rafael Anton Irisarri on September 1, 2016, with contact microphones placed on the walls. The recording was edited by Nicolai, mixed by Sakamoto, and released on February 16, 2018, via Nicolai's label NOTON. A video of the performance was also filmed by Derrick Belcham and uploaded to the Glass House's official website and Vimeo on November 11, 2016.

== Composition ==
"Glass" is an unconventional ambient composition of several fragments of sound coming together into various layers that subtly grow and shrink and play over a drone. According to Resident Advisor, "the melodies emphasise the fragility of glass, while the drone underlines its solidity and sturdiness, lending the composition a duality that it wrestles with over its 37-minute length." It differs from Nicolai and Sakamoto's previous works for its emphasis on the vibrations of acoustic textures rather than electronically made sounds. It includes dark tones from a Sequential Circuits synth, mallet-rubbed glass that go through processing, and high-pitched crotales.

Irene Shum, who co-ordinated and arranged the installation, described Sakamoto and Nicolai's performance as "call and response," which was also noted by writer Nenad Goergievski: "This it is an ambient articulation where the artists respond to the moment rather than predicating it." The performance not only processed the glass but also its outside environment, as it rained in the beginning of the performance before clearing up. The rain resulted in shrieking-like sounds.

Journalist Andy Beta noted an "intensifying sense of unease it evolves," elaborating that "When Noto and Sakamoto introduce an even higher sound it evokes a physical sensation akin to freezing rain suddenly turning to ice, brittle and crystalline," but also analyzed it was "infused with a warmth that slowly permeates the final moments of the piece." Similarly, Goergievski, noting both ear-friendly and "dissonant" sounds in the track, described it as a "complex recording where the artists weave together an aural tapestry of great and dark beauty, where the patterns and the nuances may be difficult to initially perceive."

== Critical reception ==
Professional ratings
Aggregate scores
Source	Rating
Album of the Year	81/100
Metacritic	85/100
Review scores
Source	Rating
ACRN	7.5/10
All About Jazz	4/5 stars
Exclaim!	8/10
Pitchfork	7.5/10
PopMatters	9/10 stars
Resident Advisor	3.7/5
Spectrum Culture	3.75/5
Sputnikmusic	4.2/5
Tiny Mix Tapes	4/5 stars

"Glass" was critically acclaimed. Sputnikmusic honored it as "austere as it is brimming with creativity; an anomaly that beckons its willing listeners into immersing themselves into the chilling aura the composition will undoubtedly evoke." According to XLR8R, "Glass exemplifies what a beautifully mysterious form ambient improvisation can be. For just about the entire listening process, the boundary between your conscious and unconscious is diminished. You become almost unaware that you are listening to an audio recording for the music has somehow merged with your travelling thoughts." The source labeled it as a "deeply immersive" and "transportive," but Daniel Bromfield of Spectrum Culture found it too short for it to be an immersive track. Jason P. Woodbury of Reliz commented "If The Revenant fixated on the struggle between man against nature, then the beauty of Glass suggests the potential for harmony".

Georgievski claimed the piece "has allowed both [Nicolai and Sakamoto] to reach new sonic vistas and further extend their already impressive compositional palettes," also writing that "both artists are masters of crafting a mystery and otherness from what's on offer." Bromfield opined it presents "a brilliant synthesis of the extremes the two artists represent: beautiful but potentially dangerous." Beta wrote that it "shows off Sakamoto's late-era mastery in working with more experimental artists," while Exclaim! opined that "the duo's ability to take such a well-worn concept and turn it into a piece so meticulous and touching is a testament to their uniquely fruitful partnership." However, Andrew Ryce, while finding "Glass" "good for close listening, trading narrative for pure texture and mood," wrote that it was mostly on the Glass House that contributed to the track's quality rather than effort from Sakamoto and Nicolai.

== Track listing ==
Glass
No.	Title	Length
1.	"Glass"	36:58
Total length:		36:58

== Personnel ==
Derived from the liner notes of Glass.

- Recorded and engineered by Rafael Anton Irisarri
- Edited by Carsten Nicolai
- Mixed by Ryuichi Sakamoto
- Technical support by Alec Fellman
- Cover art photography by Derrick Belcham, JJ Jimenez, and Matthew Placek
- Inner sleeve photography by Matthew Placek
- Liner notes by Irene Shum

== Release history ==
Region	Date	Format(s)	Label
Worldwide	February 16, 2018	CD; digital download; vinyl	NOTON
