= Unitxt =

Studio album by Alva Noto
- Released: July 22, 2008
- Recorded: during Raster-Noton Japan tours 2006 and 2007, reviewed and edited in Berlin in 2008.
- Genre: Ambient, experimental, microsound, glitch
- Length: 55:20
- Label: Raster-Noton r-n095

Alva Noto chronology
Aleph-1 (2007)	Unitxt (2008)	Xerrox Vol.2 (2009)

Professional ratings
Review scores
Source	Rating
Pop Matters	6/10 stars
Tiny Mix Tapes	3.5/5 marks

Unitxt is the fifth studio album by German electronic artist Alva Noto. It was released on July 22, 2008, via Raster-Noton label.

== Background ==
The word "Unitxt" means the processing of rhythmic patterns (unit = unit of measurement, element) and information (txt = data, language). The album is the first installment in a trilogy, followed by 2011's Univrs and 2018's Unieqav. Alva Noto initiated the Uni trilogy when he was booked to play live at the legendary club UNIT in Tokyo, so the project was started to adapt his music accordingly for the club's unique environment.

== Reception ==
Dimitri Nasrallah of Exclaim! wrote "Unitxt, however, is a major leap forward from both Transform and the kind of glitch music that made headways at the turn of the century. Nicolai is working with more complex arrangements here and he appears more willing to let things get a bit messy, allowing sharp bursts of dissonance to enter the mix. It's fitting that nostalgia for the more serious techno of Mille Plateaux, Max Ernst and Raster-Noton has lately drifted back into the minimal mindsets of new acts like Shed and Stefan Goldmann, artists who find the current club culture a bit too formulaic and crowded to produce anything new. A release like Unitxt is a fitting and timely portrait of an uncompromising master at work".

Lukas Suveg of Tiny Mix Tapes stated "A curious dichotomy exists in Unitxt, the latest album from Carsten Nicolai, a.k.a. Alva Noto. Nicolai’s work relies on mathematical processes to govern rhythm (rather than traditional sequencers), utilizing machine noises — modems, telephones, and fax tones — for most of its sounds. On Unitxt, Alva Noto applies these frigid clicks and blips to an innate form of human expression: each track is about 120 bpm, and the rhythms, though often heavily obscured or syncopated, are entirely in 4/4 time — the basic ingredients for a dance album".

== Track listing ==
All tracks are written by Alva Noto.

No.	Title	Length
1.	"U_07"	7:57
2.	"U_06"	2:07
3.	"U_04"	5:15
4.	"U_09-1-2"	4:48
5.	"U_08-1"	3:13
6.	"U_03"	4:30
7.	"U_08"	5:37
8.	"U_01-2-0"	4:00
9.	"U_05"	3:20
10.	"U_09-0"	3:53
11.	"(no audio)"	3:00
12.	"60308_47"	0:13
13.	"838TP7cdp"	0:04
14.	"Enigma4.0"	0:05
15.	"Fontlab4.0"	0:51
16.	"Hyperengine"	0:10
17.	"Entourage"	0:54
18.	"Excel"	1:07
19.	"Powerpoint"	0:45
20.	"Word"	1:41
21.	"Monitortest"	0:06
22.	"Morse"	0:08
23.	"Prototype6_isdn"	0:08
24.	"Serialbox"	0:29
25.	"Soundmaker"	0:07
26.	"Spray16x9s"	1:07
Total length:		55:20

Track 11 is unlisted.

== Credits ==
- Alva Noto – primary artist, composer, sounds
- Anne-James Chaton – vocals
