= Aleph-1 (album) =

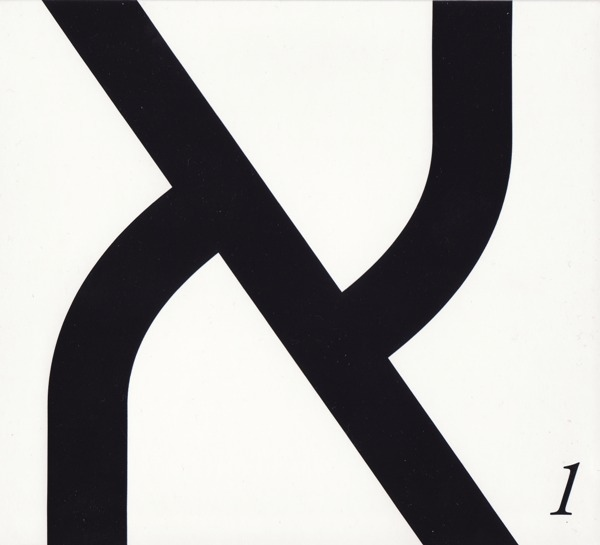

Studio album by Alva Noto
- Released: December 31, 2007
- Recorded: 2006
- Genre: Electronic, glitch, IDM
- Length: 53:15
- Label: iDEAL Recordings iDEAL048

Alva Noto chronology
Xerrox Vol.1 (2007)	Aleph-1 (2007)	Unitxt (2008)

Aleph-1 is the fourth studio album by German electronic artist Alva Noto. The record was released on December 31, 2007, via iDeal Recordings label.

== Aleph 1 ==
This is an eponymous album as he used one of his stage names, Aleph-1. The concept of the album and its name, Aleph-1, derive from the theories of German mathematician Georg Cantor, who was a teacher in Halle, Saxony-Anhalt, Germany, a city, to which Alva Noto is deeply connected with through his family. In mathematical terms, $\aleph_1$ is the cardinality of the set of all countable ordinal numbers or a number of elements in endless successions.

== Reception ==
A reviewer of Boomkat stated "Always cause for no small amount of excitement, a new release from Carsten Nicolai tends to be a pretty significant event for the electronic music community. As suggested by the new moniker, the Aleph-1 project marks a departure from some of the more familiar Alva Noto approaches to composition, although these recordings do tie in to some extent with the rhythmic minimalism plotted out by Nicolai's older work, marking a step back from the more harmonic Xerrox material from last year. The most immediately striking aspect of this music is the presence of a pronounced melodic element, something that's previously barely featured in Nicolai's solo recordings. This manifests itself by replacing the abrupt prickling static soundset of the Transrapid/Transspray/Transvision triptych with more resonant, rounded tones, with simple, sustaining waves evolving gradually over the course of each piece within a network of looping, modulating phrases. This being Carsten Nicolai, the use of melody never makes itself too explicit, instead relying on a mesmeric, cumulative effect for its power. There's a subtlety and precision at work throughout Aleph-1, and after spending some time with these pieces you'll find yourself thoroughly absorbed by their awkward, immense beauty".

== Track listing ==
All tracks are written by Alva Noto

No.	Title	Length
1.	"1 C A a 01x"	7:46
2.	"1 C A b 05"	2:24
3.	"1 C A c 08.2.2"	7:56
4.	"1 C A d 04"	3:36
5.	"1 C A e 02"	8:50
6.	"1 C A f 0.2n 1"	5:36
7.	"1 C A g 08.4s"	8:55
8.	"1 C A h 09"	3:40
Total length:		53:15
