= The Revenant (soundtrack) =

The Revenant: Original Motion Picture Soundtrack

Soundtrack album by Ryuichi Sakamoto, Alva Noto and Bryce Dessner
- Released: December 25, 2015
- Recorded: Seattlemusic Scoring Stage; (Seattle); Studio P4; (Berlin)
- Genre: Ambient
- Length: 70:43
- Label: Milan Records

Ryuichi Sakamoto and Alva Noto chronology
Summvs (2011)	The Revenant (2015)

Ryuichi Sakamoto chronology
Perpetual (2015)	The Revenant (2015)	Nagasaki: Memories of My Son (2016)

Alva Noto chronology
Xerrox Vol.3 (2015)	The Revenant (2015)	Unieqav (2018)

The Revenant: Original Motion Picture Soundtrack is a soundtrack album for the 2015 film, The Revenant, composed by Ryuichi Sakamoto and Alva Noto with additional music by Bryce Dessner. It was released digitally on December 25, 2015, and on CD on January 8, 2016 by Milan Records.

== Overview ==
In September 2015, Japanese musician Ryuichi Sakamoto was announced as the composer for director Alejandro González Iñárritu's The Revenant. The two originally came in contact with each other after Iñárritu used songs of Sakamoto's in his 2006 film Babel. Following a year-long professional hiatus in 2014 after being diagnosed with a type of throat cancer, Sakamoto's work on The Revenant marked his return to the industry despite still being in the middle of recovery. In October 2015, it was revealed that Alva Noto (the stage name for Carsten Nicolai) and The National's Bryce Dessner would join Sakamoto in scoring the film. Alva Noto, a frequent collaborator of Sakamoto's, was brought in personally by Sakamoto due to his concerns of health and fulfilling the scope of the score. "What reason I called Carsten was simply, physically, the amount of music for this film is just gigantic," said Sakamoto in an interview with Rolling Stone "And naturally Alejandro wants acoustic music, like strings or whatever and very, um, edgy electronic music. Processed music. So it seemed very naturally to call Carsten you know?"

Primary scoring sessions with Sakamoto took place throughout October 2015 at Bastyr Chapel's Seattlemusic Scoring Stage in Seattle.

Milan Records released the soundtrack album digitally on December 25, 2015 and on CD on January 8, 2016. While the soundtrack album features the music composed specifically for the film, there are many contemporary compositions featured in the film.

== Reception ==
Professional ratings
Aggregate scores
Source	Rating
Metacritic	77/100
Review scores
Source	Rating
The Arts Desk	5/5 stars
Consequence	B
Exclaim!	8/10
éclat	3/5 stars
Mojo	3/5 stars
NPR	(favorable)
Pitchfork Media	7.3/10
PopMatters	8/10
Under the Radar	8/10
The Wire	4/5 stars

The musical score has received positive reviews.

Writing for New York magazine, Justin Davidson compared Sakamoto's score to the contemporaneous score by Ennio Morricone for The Hateful Eight, stating:

Iñárritu made a completely different choice of composer: Ryuichi Sakamoto, who came to film from a career in experimental electronics... Sakamoto's is the more successful score. Both films slouch toward inevitable spasms of bloodshed, with long pensive stretches in between... Sakamoto slowly progresses through glacial chords that build toward a fortissimo horizon... The score doesn't so much follow the action here as lead it, urging the fighters on, even as it registers their single-minded lunacy.

The score was nominated for Best Original Score at the 2016 Golden Globe Awards, and Best Film Music at the 2016 British Academy Film Awards (BAFTAs), in both cases it was beaten by Morricone's soundtrack.

The score was ruled ineligible for the Academy Award for Best Original Score at the 2016 Oscars because it was "assembled from the music of more than one composer". 20th Century Fox appealed against the decision and Sakamoto wrote a letter to the academy explaining his work. Director Iñárritu was particularly unhappy about the decision. Speaking to Indiewire, Iñárritu said

The Academy is demanding that the way young musicians approach making music for film is narrow. That's super sad, they should be exploring new ways. Music is so powerful, that's an undeniable shame. This is the second time they are not doing it right for colleagues in the work. And this is scandalous.

== Track listing ==
No.	Title	Artists	Length
1.	"The Revenant Main Theme"	Ryuichi Sakamoto	2:41
2.	"Hawk Punished"	Alva Noto & Bryce Dessner	2:14
3.	"Carrying Glass"	Ryuichi Sakamoto & Alva Noto	3:07
4.	"First Dream"	Ryuichi Sakamoto & Alva Noto	3:05
5.	"Killing Hawk"	Ryuichi Sakamoto	3:49
6.	"Discovering River"	Ryuichi Sakamoto	1:11
7.	"Goodbye to Hawk"	Ryuichi Sakamoto	3:41
8.	"Discovering Buffalo"	Ryuichi Sakamoto & Alva Noto	2:43
9.	"Hell Ensemble"	Ryuichi Sakamoto	2:38
10.	"Glass and Buffalo Warrior Travel"	Ryuichi Sakamoto	1:51
11.	"Arriving at Fort Kiowa"	Ryuichi Sakamoto	1:21
12.	"Church Dream"	Ryuichi Sakamoto & Alva Noto	2:38
13.	"Powaqa Rescue"	Ryuichi Sakamoto, Alva Noto & Bryce Dessner	5:35
14.	"Imagining Buffalo"	Bryce Dessner	2:39
15.	"The Revenant Theme 2"	Ryuichi Sakamoto	1:54
16.	"Second Dream"	Ryuichi Sakamoto & Alva Noto	1:13
17.	"Out of Horse"	Ryuichi Sakamoto	3:57
18.	"Looking for Glass"	Bryce Dessner	2:51
19.	"Cat & Mouse"	Ryuichi Sakamoto, Alva Noto & Bryce Dessner	5:42
20.	"The Revenant Main Theme Atmospheric"	Ryuichi Sakamoto	2:50
21.	"Final Fight"	Ryuichi Sakamoto & Bryce Dessner	6:35
22.	"The End"	Ryuichi Sakamoto	2:16
23.	"The Revenant Theme (Alva Noto Remodel)"	Ryuichi Sakamoto & Alva Noto	4:00
Total length:			70:43

== Personnel ==
Production

- Ryuichi Sakamoto – composer/conductor
- Alva Noto – composer
- Bryce Dessner – composer
- André de Ridder – conductor
- stargaze – orchestra
- David Sabee – contractor
- Simon James – concertmaster
- Norika Sora – music production supervisor

Management

- Christine Bergren – music clearance and legal
- Merle Scheske – orchestra manager
- Jon Schluckerbier – stage manager
- Dave West – stage manager

Orchestration

- Hildur Guðnadóttir – cello
- Daniel Orthey, Gunnar Kötke, David Gutfleisch, Felix Ernst – Frantic Percussion Ensemble
- Motoko Oya – ondes Martenot
- Alex Petchu – additional percussion
- Aart Strootman – music preparation
- Stephen Feigenbaum – music preparation
- Audrey DeRoche – score supervisor

Technical

- Martin Hernández – music editor
- Joseph S. Debeasi – music editor
- Richard Henderson – music editor
- Steven Saltzman – music editor
- Curt Sobel – music editor
- Terry Wilson – music editor
- Conrad Hensel – score recordist/score mixer
- Alec Fellman – production manager/assistant engineer
- Jonathan Feurich – recording engineer (Hamburg)
- Zak – recording engineer (Tokyo)
- Alex Venguer – recording engineer (New York)
- Kiyoharu Terada – assistant engineer (Tokyo)
- Nick S.S. Banns – assistant engineer (New York)
- Fernando Aponte – consulting engineer (New York)
- Kaz Tsujio – piano technician (New York)
- Yoshie May – piano technician (Los Angeles)
- Takeshi Sakai – piano technician (Tokyo)
- Hiroaki Mizutani – piano technician (Tokyo)
- Scott Smith – score mixer
- Conrad Hansel – scoring engineer
- Kory Kruckenberg – Pro Tools engineer
- John Winters – second engineer
- Eduardo De La Paz Canel – Pro Tools operator
- Tom Russbueldt – recording engineer

== Additional music ==
Additional music credited in The Revenant:

Title	Musician(s)	Key scenes/Notes
"Arikara Elder"	Chesley Wilson	Sung by actor Chesley Wilson at the tail end of the Arikara ambush.
"Qilyuan"	John Luther Adams	Plays at the start of the Arikara ambush.
"Become Ocean"	John Luther Adams	Plays during the Arikara ambush. Adams' piece was also featured in the film's first official teaser trailer.
"Haloid Xerrox Copy 11"	Alva Noto	
"Xerrox Spiegel"	Alva Noto	Plays as Hugh Glass leaves his son and heads west.
"Haloid Xerrox Copy 1"	Alva Noto	
"Xerrox Spark"	Alva Noto	
"Jetsun Mila (Excerpt)"	Éliane Radigue	
"The Place Where You Go to Listen"	John Luther Adams	
"Miss McLeod's Reel"	Michael Fraser, Scott Duncan	
"Harakiri Opening (from Harakiri – Death of a Samurai starring Ichikawa Ebizō XI from NHK Taiga drama, Hana no Ran, and Eita from Fuji TV Japanese drama, Last Friends)"	Ryuichi Sakamoto	
"Messiaen: Oraison"	Olivier Messiaen	Fête des belles eaux - IV. L'eau (sans monodic introduction). Plays as Glass emerges from the dead horse. This music is extracted from the fourth movement of Messiaen's aforementioned suite and was later incorporated into his Quatuor pour la fin du temps.
"Taboos"	Ryuichi Sakamoto	
"Glacier"	Ryuichi Sakamoto, Skúli Sverrisson, Ren Takada	
"Stoukur"	Hildur Guðnadóttir	
"Op.1–1"	Ryoji Ikeda	
"Duoon"	Alva Noto + Ryuichi Sakamoto	
"Viisari"	Vladislav Delay	
"Lachrimae"	Bryce Dessner	
"Viaton"	Vladislav Delay	
"Whitten"	Hildur Guðnadóttir	

== Charts ==
Chart (2016)	Peak position
Belgian Albums (Ultratop Flanders)	154
