= Xerrox Vol.3 =

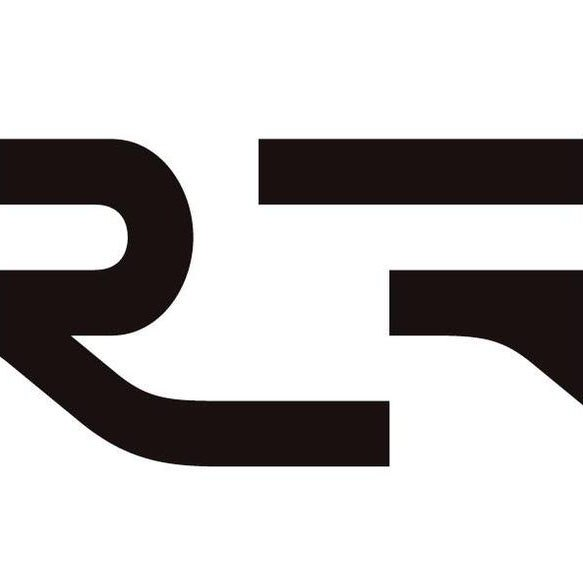

Studio album by Alva Noto
- Released: 31 March 2015
- Recorded: 2008–2014
- Genre: Electronic, ambient, dark ambient, drone
- Length: 56:33
- Label: Raster-Noton r-n159

Alva Noto chronology
Univrs (2011)	Xerrox Vol.3 (2015)	The Revenant (2015)

Professional ratings
Review scores
Source	Rating
Allmusic	4/5 stars
Sputnikmusic	4.1/5

Xerrox Vol.3 is the eighth solo studio album by German electronic artist Alva Noto. The record was released on 31 March 2015 via Raster-Noton label, continuing his Xerrox pentalogy.

== Background ==
The two previous albums in the series are: Xerrox Vol.1 (2007) and Xerrox Vol.2 (2009). In a statement, the author described the album as a "cinematographic emotion of a soundtrack to a film that actually does not exist in reality." It was inspired by childhood memories of the '70s films Solaris, directed by Andrei Tarkovsky in 1972, and La isla misteriosa y el capitán Nemo, directed by Juan Antonio Bardem and Henri Colpi in 1973.

== Reception ==
Paul Simpson of AllMusic commented "Alva Noto's Xerrox series of albums take a break from the overwhelming glitchcore of some of his other releases (particularly ones that begin with Uni- or Trans-), instead opting to explore more ambient pastures. The series is particularly themed around copying and data manipulation, and previous volumes had a hazy, corroded edge to them. Xerrox, Vol. 3, however, focuses on dreams and childhood memories, and is much more serene than the previous volumes, coming closer to Alva Noto's work with Ryuichi Sakamoto".

Alex Hudson of Exclaim! wrote "Like past instalments in the series, Xerrox Vol. 3 was created by using extensive reproduction (a bit like the document copying company Xerox, in other words). This allowed Nicolai to create new sounds by rendering the source recordings unrecognizable... In a statement, Nicolai described the album as a "cinematographic emotion of a soundtrack to a film that actually does not exist in reality".

== Track listing ==
All tracks are written by Alva Noto

No.	Title	Length
1.	"Xerrox Atmosphere"	1:23
2.	"Xerrox Helm Transphaser"	6:45
3.	"Xerrox 2ndevol"	3:44
4.	"Xerrox Radieuse"	6:00
5.	"Xerrox 2ndevol2nd"	5:05
6.	"Xerrox Isola"	8:07
7.	"Xerrox Solphaer"	6:09
8.	"Xerrox Mesosphere"	5:55
9.	"Xerrox Spark"	6:10
10.	"Xerrox Spiegel"	3:33
11.	"Xerrox Exosphere"	3:48
Total length:		56:33

== Credits ==
- Design – Studio Carsten Nicolai
- Sounds (all samples xeroxed by) – Carsten Nicolai
