= Xerrox Vol.1 =

Studio album by Alva Noto
- Released: March 27, 2007
- Recorded: October 2005 – October 2006
- Genre: Electronic
- Length: 61:57
- Label: Raster-Noton r-n078

Alva Noto chronology
| Transspray (2005) | Xerrox Vol.1 (2007) | Aleph-1 (2007) |

Professional ratings
Review scores
| Source | Rating |
|---|---|
| Allmusic | 3/5 stars |

Xerrox Vol.1 is the third studio album by German electronic artist Alva Noto. It was released on March 27, 2007 via Raster-Noton label. This is his first album in the five-piece Xerrox series, followed by Xerrox Vol.2 (2009), Xerrox Vol.3 (2015), Xerrox Vol.4 (2020), and Xerrox Vol.5 (2024).

== Reception ==
Paul Lloyd of Igloo Magazine stated "Nicolai proves his theory about the replication of source material wonderfully with Xerrox Vol.1 and he does so by creating thematically similar tracks that, with often the smallest and most subtle of changes, replicate each other in many ways yet are fundamentally different in others. Housed in a beautifully designed multi-fold folder and protected with its own plastic sleeve, Xerrox Vol.1 is packaged with the care and attention Raster-Noton are known for and is carried through to the music they release".

Susanna Bolle of Dusted commented "It's a beguiling pretty record, which is not something you'd necessarily expect from a conceptual project so tightly focused on the process of digital reproduction. Its unerring prettiness is also its greatest weakness. It's an immensely pleasurable disc, but the ideas underpinning Xerrox promise more than gauzed, seductive beauty. Nicolai is more than capable of fusing high concept with aesthetic enjoyment -- just look at his previous Transall. Ultimately, Xerrox, Vol. 1 falls somewhat short of the mark it sets for itself".

== Track listing ==
All tracks are written by Alva Noto

| No. | Title | Length |
|---|---|---|
| 1. | "10-22-38 Astoria" | 0:19 |
| 2. | "Haliod Xerrox Copy 4" | 3:53 |
| 3. | "03-10-06 Astoria" | 0:38 |
| 4. | "Haliod Xerrox Copy 3 (Paris)" | 11:17 |
| 5. | "03-10-06 Astoria 2" | 0:36 |
| 6. | "Haliod Xerrox Copy 2 (Airfrance)" | 5:07 |
| 7. | "Haliod Xerrox Copy 6" | 6:40 |
| 8. | "05-10-06 Astoria" | 0:22 |
| 9. | "Haliod Xerrox Copy 11" | 3:40 |
| 10. | "Haliod Xerrox Copy 1" | 9:16 |
| 11. | "02-10-06 Astoria 1" | 0:52 |
| 12. | "Haliod Xerrox Copy 111 (Iner)" | 7:56 |
| 13. | "09-10-19 Astoria" | 0:18 |
| 14. | "Haliod Xerrox Copy 9" | 11:04 |
| Total length: | | 1:01:57 |
