= Univrs =

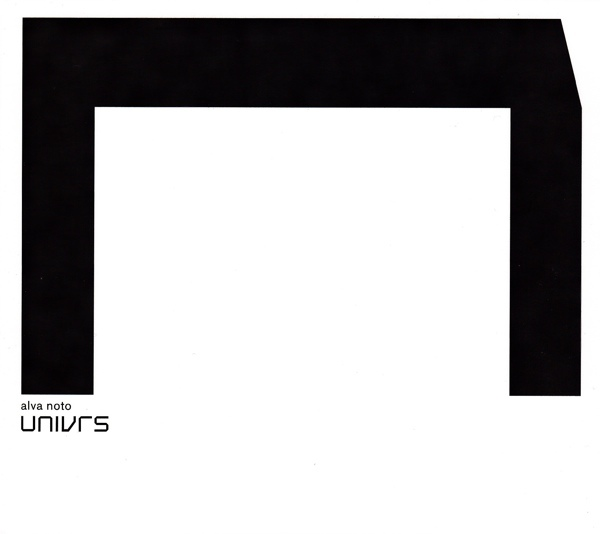

Studio album by Alva Noto
- Released: 10 October 2011
- Recorded: 2011
- Studio: Studio Carsten Nicolai in Berlin
- Genre: Microsound, glitch
- Length: 1:02:44
- Label: Raster-Noton r-n133

Alva Noto chronology
Xerrox Vol.2 (2009)	Univrs (2011)	Xerrox Vol.3 (2015)

Professional ratings
Review scores
Source	Rating
Tiny Mix Tapes	3.5/5 stars
Sputnikmusic	3.5/5

Univrs is the seventh studio album by German electronic artist Alva Noto. It was released on 10 October 2011 via Raster-Noton label.

== Background ==
The album follows the same concept as Alva Noto's 2008 album Unitxt. While the focus of Unitxt is on the processing of rhythmic patterns ('unit' = unit of measurement, element) and information ('txt' = data, language), Univrs focuses on the conceptual differentiation of a universal language ('universum/universal' = unity, entirety). Like Unitxt, the album features a vocal part by Anne-James Chaton, who reads through three-letter acronyms on the track "uni acronym". The album also contains a visual element. Univrs was followed by the third installment in the trilogy—2018's Unieqav.

== Reception ==
A reviewer of ATTN Magazine commented "Univrs is at home at high volume and out of speakers, at which point it makes a very primitive contact with its listener – via bass and recurrent rhythm – and it forcefully demands movement, in both the invisible buzz of air vibration and the dance moves of its audience. Yet it’s never enough to drown out the craftsmanship behind the placement of each beat and the beautiful interaction between elements. Somewhere within that club music euphoria is always embedded an appreciation for Nicolai’s impressive artistry – this is incredibly hypnotic stuff, but never ever mindlessly so".

Matthew Wuethrich of Dusted Magazine stated "The music here is seductive, hypnotic at times. Its droning passages are as exhilarating as its rhythmic ones. But as Univrs progresses, this thrill starts to feel decadent, as if Nicolai is looking for more to say but just keeps utilizing the same vocabulary. The tension that his previous work thrived on, the one that drew on the gap between what we knew and what we were hearing, is gone. It re-emerges on Uni Acronym, where Anne-James Chaton monotones a long alphabetical list of acronyms that rule our life (from BBC and JVC to PVC and XML) over a noisy, percolating techno-funk backdrop. Concept and execution collide, but only for a moment, and even this list starts to seem obvious. Yes, our life is ruled by the data of others, and more often than not we adjust our lives to its patterns, not vice versa. But we know this. And Alva Noto used to tell us things we didn't know, used to do more than just confirm our suspicions".

== Track listing ==
All tracks are written by Alva Noto.

No.	Title	Length
1.	"Uni C"	6:32
2.	"Uni Fac"	4:35
3.	"Uni Asymmetric Tone"	1:15
4.	"Uni Rec (Sounds [Siren Synth - Mutesound] – Martin L. Gore)"	7:32
5.	"Uni Dia"	5:54
6.	"Uni Iso"	10:17
7.	"Uni Mode"	1:53
8.	"Uni Acronym (featuring voice of Anne-James Chaton)"	6:23
9.	"Uni Asymmetric Noises"	1:52
10.	"Uni Deform"	3:33
11.	"Uni Asymmetric III-IIII"	1:29
12.	"Uni Syc"	5:00
13.	"Uni Asymmetric Sweep"	3:12
14.	"Uni Pro"	3:17
Total length:		1:02:44

== Personnel ==
- Carsten Nicolai – all sounds
- Rashad Becker – mastering
