= Frank Bretschneider =

German electronic musician

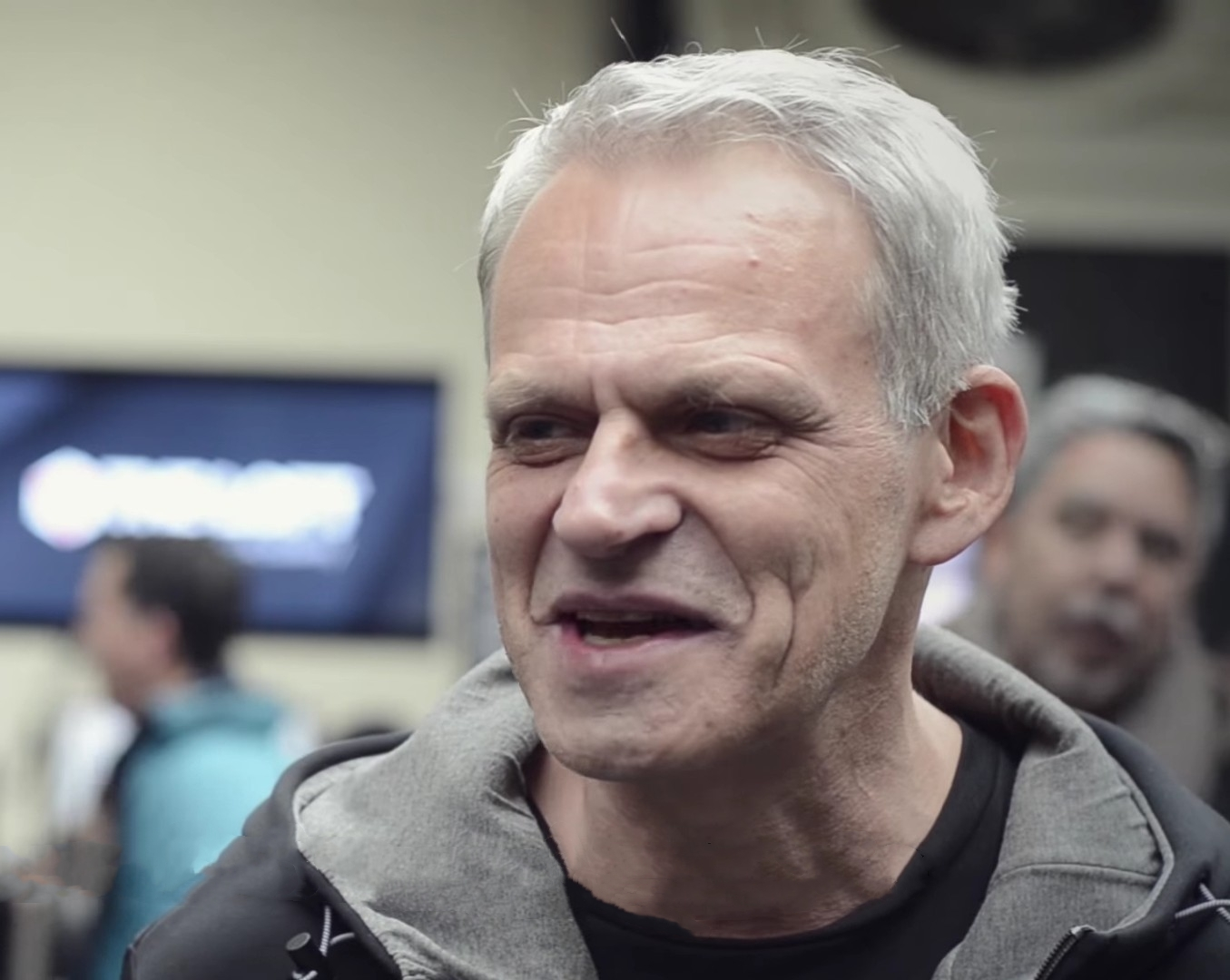
Frank Bretschneider (2015)

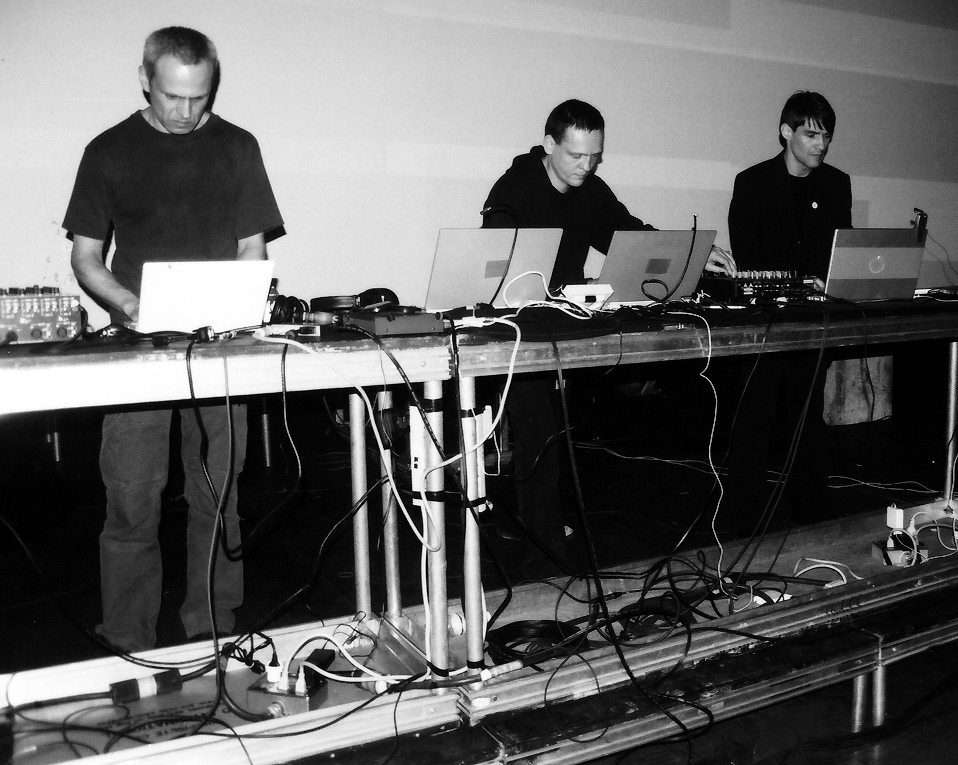
The group Signal (from left to right): Frank Bretschneider (Komet), Carsten Nicolai (Noto) and Olaf Bender (Byetone), playing live at MUTEK 2004

Frank Bretschneider (born 1956) is a German electronic musician. He works primarily with sine waves and white noise as his source material. He also releases material under the name Komet.

Bretschneider was born and raised in Karl-Marx-Stadt (now Chemnitz) in the German Democratic Republic (East Germany).

In 1984, inspired by science fiction radio plays and films, he began experimenting with tape machines, synthesizers, and modified guitars. In 1986 he formed the band AG. Geige (German: work group violin), which was influenced by the Dada art movement, The Residents, and Soviet science fiction. AG. Geige disbanded in 1992.

In 1995, Bretschneider and fellow AG. Geige band member Olaf Bender founded the Rastermusic record label. In 1999 this label merged with Carsten Nicolai's Noton label, to become Raster-Noton. Bretschneider has released material on record labels such as 12k, Raster-Noton, Mille Plateaux, Fällt and Bip Hop.
