= Transform (Alva Noto album) =

Studio album by Alva Noto
- Released: September 4, 2001
- Genre: Electronic, abstract, minimal, experimental
- Length: 57:11
- Label: Mille Plateaux mp 102

Alva Noto chronology
Prototypes (2000)	Transform (2001)	Transrapid (2004)

Professional ratings
Review scores
Source	Rating
Allmusic	4/5 stars
Pitchfork Media	7.4/10

Transform is the second studio album by German electronic artist Alva Noto. It was released on September 4, 2001 via Mille Plateaux label. The album was re-released in 2008 via Raster-Noton label. The album is the first part of Alva Noto's Transall series, along with the EPs Transrapid, Transspray, and Transvision (2001–2006).

== Reception ==
Mark Richard-San of Pitchfork wrote "Nicolai's keen sense of rhythm is the first thing you'll notice about Transform ... While Transform is a solid success on its own terms, the record lacks a certain spark that might push it into greatness. There are no moments of wonder, where you pause and listen closer, straining to understand how something so little could affect you so much. It is possible to achieve the sublime with these limited ingredients (see Ikeda, for one), but Transform is merely good.".

== Track listing ==
All tracks are written by Alva Noto

No.	Title	Length
1.	"m 01"	5:50
2.	"m 02"	3:37
3.	"m 03"	10:09
4.	"m 04"	6:26
5.	"m 05"	4:43
6.	"m 06"	5:36
7.	"m 07"	4:58
8.	"m 08"	5:27
9.	"m 09"	7:45
10.	"m 10"	2:41
Total length:		57:11
