= Vrioon =

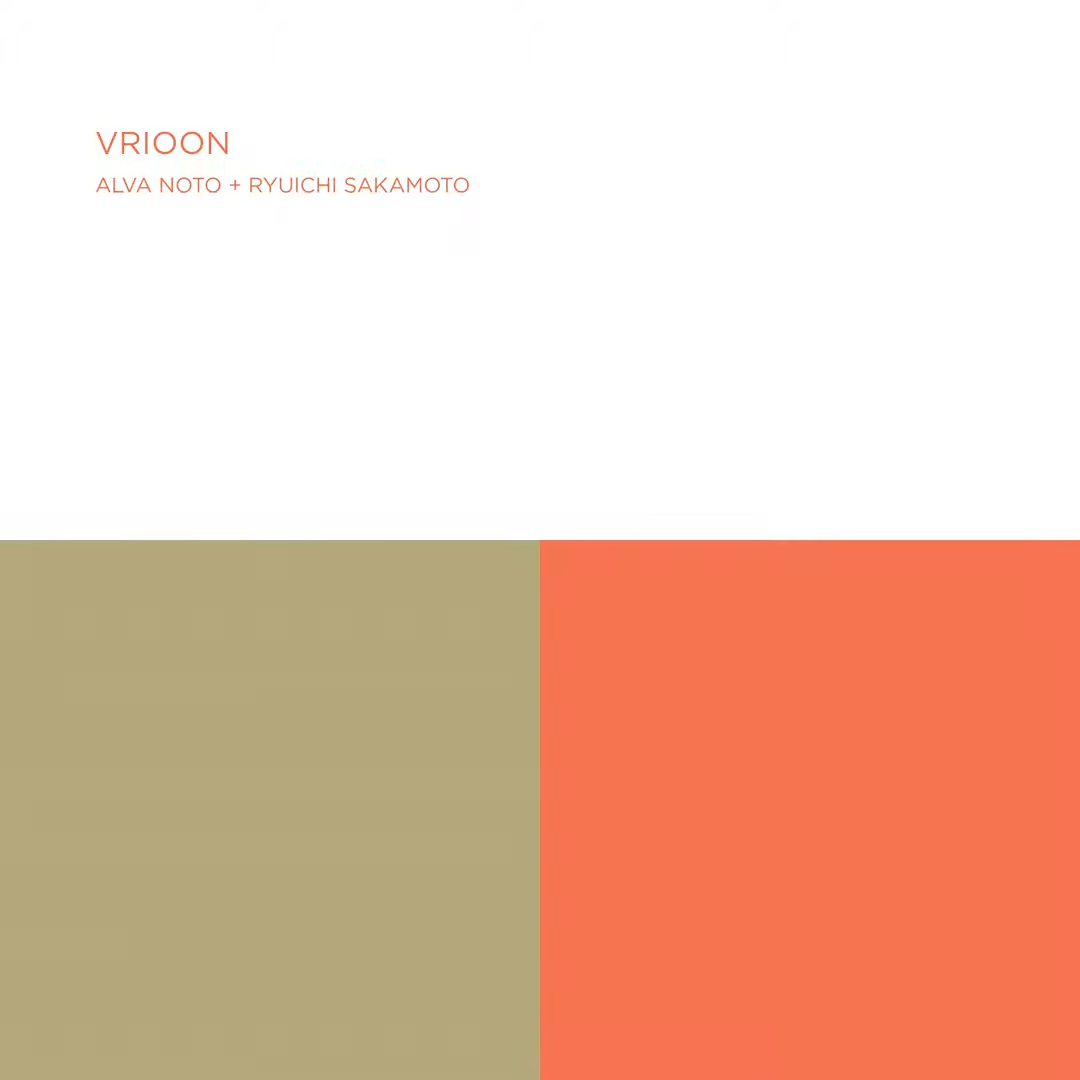

Studio album by Ryuichi Sakamoto and Alva Noto
- Released: December 2002
- Genre: Electronic, minimalism
- Length: 54:39
- Label: Raster-Noton r-n050-2

Ryuichi Sakamoto and Alva Noto chronology
Vrioon (2002)	Insen (2005)

Vrioon is the debut collaboration album between Ryuichi Sakamoto and Alva Noto, released in 2002. This is the first album in the Virus Series followed by four other records: Insen (2005), Revep (2006), utp_ (2008), and Summvs (2011). The initial letters of the five albums together form the word "Virus".

== Overview ==
A minimalist album, it is characterized by an unusual experimental sound driven by piano and distorted, clipped samples (a sound which Sakamoto and Noto would also experiment with in Insen in 2005). The album was elected among the first 50 albums of 2003 by magazine The Wire. It was also named album of the year in 2004 by The Wire magazine.

== Reception ==
Vrioon places the same sort of minimalism in a very different context. You almost had to tune out Transform to enjoy it, it so filled with absence, but with Sakamoto's piano underlying the circuitry, Vrioon could conceivably be said to have a presence. The romantic Sakamoto dwells heavily on his feelings, soaking the music in melodrama wherever possible, and rarely alters the predominant tone of mumpish solemnity. Thus noto's electronics take on a new purpose, adding enterprise to otherwise inward-looking compositions. Symbiosis in action.

—Ben Tausig, Dusted Magazine

== Track listing ==
No.	Title	Length
1.	"Uoon I"	13:51
2.	"Uoon II"	9:40
3.	"Duoon"	5:46
4.	"Noon"	10:13
5.	"Trioon I"	5:09
6.	"Trioon II"	9:57
Total length:		54:39

== Personnel ==
- Ryuichi Sakamoto – piano
- Alva Noto – electronics
- Carsten Nicolai – Additional Sounds
