= Dataplex =

Studio album by Ryoji Ikeda
- Released: December 2005
- Genre: Microsound; minimal techno; experimental; noise
- Length: 55:31
- Label: Raster-Noton R-N 068

Dataplex (stylized as dataplex) is a 2005 album by Japanese sound artist Ryoji Ikeda. It was released in December 2005 by independent record label Raster-Noton on CD.

== Background ==
"Caution! This CD contains specific waveform data that performs a data-read test for optical drives. The last track will cause some CD players to experience playback errors, with no damage to equipment."

— Warning sticker attached inside Dataplex.

Dataplex was Ryoji Ikeda's first full-length release since his 2002's orchestral Op. It is the first part in the Datamatics series, which "interrogates and interprets the mass of raw computer data surrounding us all." Overall, it is the musician's seventh solo album. The last track, "data.adaplex", causes intentional playback errors when played on some CD players.

== Reception ==
Professional ratings
Review scores
Source	Rating
AllMusic	4/5 stars
PopMatters	8/10 stars

BBC Music's Peter Marsh praised its composition stating the tracks are "arranged with surgical precision into short slices of minimalist art-techno; funky in a very cerebral, molecular sort of fashion, they're immersive (and by track 19) almost lush and strangely beautiful." Comparing it to Autechre, PopMatters's Tim O'Neil found "everything is once again falling apart in the most remarkable fashion. The computer is rebooting."

Reflecting on Datamatics as a series, Dusted Magazine's John Seelbach called Dataplex "a surprising and enthralling start". AllMusic's Rob Theakston also said it was "a promising start to what could be one of the most ambitious projects of the post-glitch movement." Brainwashed's Jon Whitney revered the album with "rather rhythmic, challenging, and completely enjoyable: something most computer musician types have failed at."

== Track listing ==
No.	Title	Length
1.	"data.index"	1:39
2.	"data.simplex"	1:02
3.	"data.duplex"	0:53
4.	"data.triplex"	1:45
5.	"data.multiplex"	1:50
6.	"data.complex"	0:49
7.	"data.hypercomplex"	1:20
8.	"data.googolplex"	0:51
9.	"data.microhelix"	3:13
10.	"data.superhelix"	2:28
11.	"data.minimax"	3:09
12.	"data.syntax"	4:17
13.	"data.telex"	1:06
14.	"data.flex"	2:28
15.	"data.reflex"	4:16
16.	"data.convex"	1:29
17.	"data.vertex"	2:06
18.	"data.vortex"	5:49
19.	"data.matrix"	10:01
20.	"data.adaplex"	5:00
