= Elph.zwölf =

elph.zwölf

EP by ELpH
- Released: December 1999
- Genre: Experimental
- Length: 20:00
- Label: Raster-Noton
- Producer: Coil

ELpH chronology
| pHILM #1 (1994) | elph.zwölf (1999) |

elph.zwölf is one of two releases credited purely to ELpH, an alias for the group Coil. This CD was number twelve in the series 20′ to 2000, published on the German label Raster-Noton.

== Background ==
The sparse text on the CD leads to confusion of the 'proper' title.

The title of the EP is listed as "Zwölf" performed by ELpH. The name of the single track on the disc is also "Zwölf". However, on the disc itself the track listing is printed as -1. 20'00"- with the text on the cover reading 20' to 2000.December elph.zwölf. The references to Zwölf and December denote the month in which it the disc was recorded (December 31, 1999). The imprint -20'00"- on the disc itself may refer to the actual length of the track rather than being a title.

A speculated reason that Coil used their alias band name ELpH for this release, is that the German word for eleven is 'elf', and is a homophone with ELpH, while 'zwölf' means twelve in German, and the CD was the twelfth release of the series. The series was also released in Germany in an edition of 1,000 copies.

The CD is 5" in diameter, but only the inner 3" is playable as the outer edge is clear plastic.

The catalogue number for this release is 20TO200012.

== Track listing ==
1. "Zwölf" – 20:00
