= Utp (album) =

utp_
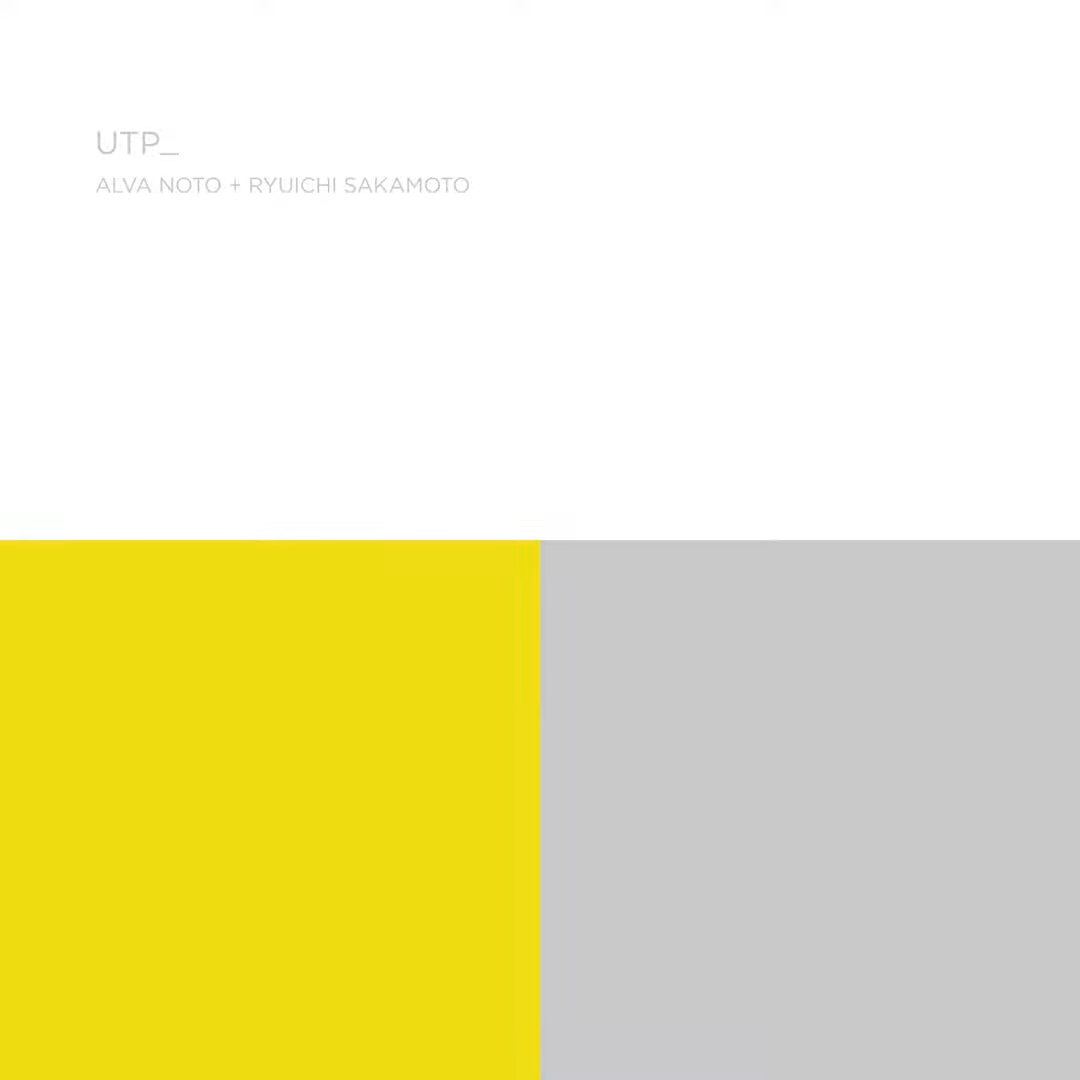

Studio album by Alva Noto & Ryuichi Sakamoto
- Released: September 17, 2008
- Recorded: November 16, 2007
- Venues: National Theatre, Mannheim, Germany
- Genres: Electronic, avant-garde
- Length: 71:58
- Label: Raster-Noton r-n 96-2
- Producer: Michael Hock

Alva Noto & Ryuichi Sakamoto chronology
Revep (2006)	utp_ (2008)	Summvs (2011)

Alternative cover
- CD/DVD cover artwork

Professional ratings
Review scores
Source	Rating
AllMusic	3.5/5 stars
Headphone Commute	Favorable

utp_ is the fourth collaboration between Alva Noto and Ryuichi Sakamoto, performed with Ensemble Modern. Recorded live at the National Theatre in Mannheim, Germany, the work was commissioned for the city's 400th anniversary.

== Reception ==
After the opening pair of compositions, the remaining disc consists of four pieces, played twice over, perhaps in adherence to the notion that an event only receives signification upon its repetition. In any case, the compositions are cleverly elliptical, loose, but with a complexity of inter-action that displaces the listener just enough. In fact, this balanced exchange between the air-locked ambience and freshness and seeming spontaneity of the string ensemble is one of the works strongest appeals; if only it had been in the least bit upset now and again, one suspects the results would be stronger still. When this set of pieces is played over for the second time, on the DVD, the lines undergo a re-harmonization, and the performance peaks with an enervated double-time section. Together with the visuals, this makes for a rich, steadily evolving continuum — Utopia in a surprisingly traditional sense.

—Max Schaefer, The Squid's Ear

== Track listing ==
1. "Attack/Transition" – 7:24
2. "Grains" – 6:24
3. "Particle 1" – 6:40
4. "Transition" – 3:31
5. "Broken Line 1" – 6:32
6. "Plateaux 1" – 8:07
7. "Silence" – 6:51
8. "Particle 2" – 7:00
9. "Broken Line 2" – 6:29
10. "Plateaux 2/End" – 12:59

== Personnel ==
- Ryuichi Sakamoto – piano, electronics
- Alva Noto – electronics
- Aaron Baird – double bass
- Rainer Romer – percussion
- Rumi Ogawa – percussion
- Johannes Schwarz – bassoon, contrabassoon
- Eva Bocker – cello
- Michael M. Kasper – cello
- John Corbett – clarinet, bass clarinet
- Nina Jansen – clarinet, bass clarinet
- Detmar Wiesner – flute, piccolo
- Patrick Judt – viola
- Yuval Gotlibovich – viola
