= Prototypes (album) =

Studio album by Alva Noto
- Released: March 14, 2000
- Recorded: 1999–2000
- Genre: Electronic, IDM, minimal, drone, sound collage
- Length: 49:40
- Label: Mille Plateaux mp 82

Alva Noto chronology
Prototypes (2000)	Transform (2001)

Professional ratings
Review scores
Source	Rating
Allmusic	3/5 stars

Prototypes is the debut studio album by German electronic artist Alva Noto. It was released on March 14, 2000 via Mille Plateaux label. For the release, Noto created sound collages from amplified electrical noises, which he arranged into a set of minimal movements.

== Reception ==
A reviewer of Brainwashed.com stated "Alva Noto is digital sound and visual artist Carsten Nicolai, a.k.a. Noto, head of the Noton half of Germany's Raster-Noton cooperative label now known simply as Raster Music. This disc is brought to us by fellow German electronic label Mille Plateaux and is referred to by them as being of the "digital processing" style. The 10 untitled tracks are a continuous suite of minimalist compositions constructed of the familiar sounds that seem to naturally emanate from everyone and everywhere in Germany these days. For nearly 50 minutes Nicolai precisely codes structured, layered loops of clicks, pops, artifacts, "beats", waves, tones, pulses, static, silence and noise into pleasant and listenable mini(mal) symphonies. The active evolution of each piece is both on a macro and micro level and the stereo field is fully explored ... attentive headphone listening ensures the full effect. And though the sounds are similar throughout, there's plenty of variation in how they are presented within each track and from track to track, this along with sharp composition skills are the keys to maintaining my interest. Nicolai is simply one of the most talented in the field. The title literally means "an original model on which something is patterned" so I can only assume that these prototypes will spawn more in the near future".

== Track listing ==
All tracks are written by Alva Noto.

No.	Title	Length
1.	"Untitled"	0:55
2.	"Untitled"	7:25
3.	"Untitled"	4:03
4.	"Untitled"	5:23
5.	"Untitled"	0:50
6.	"Untitled"	6:58
7.	"Untitled"	5:16
8.	"Untitled"	5:35
9.	"Untitled"	6:17
10.	"Untitled"	7:01
Total length:		49:40

== Personnel ==
- Alva Noto – all sounds and noises
