= Transspray =

EP by Alva Noto
- Released: 2005
- Recorded: 2002–2004
- Studio: R-N Modul Berlin, In Transit
- Genre: Electronic, abstract, minimal, experimental
- Length: 20:28
- Label: Raster Noton r-n 63

Alva Noto chronology
Transvision (2005)	Transspray (2005)	Xerrox Vol.1 (2007)

Transspray is an extended play by German electronic artist Alva Noto. It was released in 2005 via Raster Noton label.

== Background ==
This is the third and final part of the transall triptych that, according to the artist, respectively deals with one of three interrelated themes: the increased speed of information flow, utopias, and the fragmentation of ideas.

== Reception ==
A reviewer of Boomkat wrote "**Part 3 of 3** This release is presented in three CDs: Transrapid, Transvision and finally, Transspray. Across the 3 installments special emphasis is put on the rhythmic aspects of minimalism, utilising Carsten Nicolai's maverick minimal intricacies in brilliant white surroundings. There's a crisp clarity to Nicolai's construction's that's very hard to dissect - you know that you shouldn't be able to relate to this music's sparse trajectory emotionally, and yet, in between moments of microscopic dissection and malfunctioning arrangements - the material works on an incredibly moving level. Carsten Nicolai has been working on this material for over two years, these three releases also adhering to Raster Noton's strict aesthetic emphasis - housed in absolutely sublime booklet-sized die-cut packaging that visually reflects the contents to be found within. Incredible music".

== Track listing ==
All tracks are written by Alva Noto

No.	Title	Length
1.	"Fuel for Black Quartz"	0:16
2.	"R/Re/Repeat" (Sounds by Craig Willingham, I-Sound)	0:53
3.	"Bit"	5:49
4.	"Birr"	1:48
5.	"Obi One (Edit XS Version)"	2:40
6.	"F117.tiff"	1:51
7.	"Autoshape"	5:39
8.	"Spray"	1:39
Total length:		20:28

== Personnel ==
- Carsten Nicolai – sounds
- Marco Peljhan – liner notes
- Nibo, R-N Modul Berlin – design
