= Unieqav =

Studio album by Alva Noto
- Released: 16 March 2018
- Studio: Noton Studio
- Genre: Electronic, experimental, minimal techno
- Length: 54:38
- Label: Noton N-045

Alva Noto chronology
The Revenant (2015)	Unieqav (2018)

Professional ratings
Aggregate scores
Source	Rating
Metacritic	73/100
Review scores
Source	Rating
Financial Times	4/5 stars
Resident Advisor	4.1/5
Sputnikmusic	4.8/5
Tiny Mix Tapes	3/5 stars

Unieqav is the ninth solo studio album by German electronic artist Alva Noto. The record was released on 16 March 2018 via Noton label.

== Background ==
The album Unieqav is the third and final installment in his Uni trilogy after 2008’s Unitxt and 2011’s Univrs. This is also seen in the cover art for each, which, when combined, form a triptych spelling Uni. The music is more rhythmic and dancefloor-oriented. Noto explains that the compositions sonically represent an underwater dive.

== Reception ==
Ludovic Hunter-Tilney of Financial Times wrote "Nicolai’s music is inspired by science and data, a sound world of patterns and randomness, such as Unitxt’s conversion of Word and Excel files into sonic form. Patterns win out over randomness on Unieqav. Its 12 tracks are locked into intense geometric patterns, embroidered by the wonderfully detailed digital tones and textures that Nicolai conjures from his software. Sparse techno beats are imprinted in grid-like repetitions. The effect is austere but the degree of action taking place alongside ensures it does not become too severe. Track names advertise the play of difference and similarity".

Andrew Ryce of Resident Advisor stated "Nicolai does a lot with very little. He can reduce his sound down to bundles of frequencies and pulses of noise in ways that can encompass techno, ambient and drone. He can endow the barest sounds with personality, turning them into music that sounds like little else. That's why Unieqav's simple formula is so thrilling: this is dance music with masterful sound design, like techno with an operating system upgrade. The album channels Alva Noto's trademark sounds into jittery, funky music that loses none of the complexity of his more challenging work. That must have been some night in Tokyo—we're still reaping the rewards over a decade later".

== Track listing ==
All tracks are written by Alva Noto.

No.	Title	Length
1.	"Uni Sub"	5:50
2.	"Uni Mia"	5:52
3.	"Uni Version"	4:48
4.	"Uni Clip"	1:51
5.	"Uni Normal"	4:25
6.	"Uni Mic A"	3:37
7.	"Uni Blue"	5:52
8.	"Uni Mic B"	5:03
9.	"Uni DNA" (lyrics, voice – Anne-James Chaton)	5:50
10.	"Uni Edit"	1:42
11.	"Uni Tra"	4:19
12.	"Uni Chord"	5:33
Total length:		54:38

== Personnel ==
- Alva Noto – primary artist
- Bo Kondren – mastering
