= Carsten Nicolai =

German musician and visual artist

Alva Noto
- Alva Noto performing at Middlesex Lounge in Cambridge, MA, in June 2009

Background information
- Also known as: Aleph-1; noto
- Born: Carsten Nicolai; 18 September 1965 (age 61); Karl-Marx-Stadt (now Chemnitz), East Germany
- Education: Technical University of Dresden
- Genres: electronic music; glitch; microsound; minimal techno; ambient
- Occupations: musician; visual artist
- Label: Noton
- Website: carstennicolai.de

Carsten Nicolai (born 18 September 1965, in Karl-Marx-Stadt, now Chemnitz), known mostly under the pseudonym Alva Noto, is a German artist, musician, and label owner.

== Life and career ==
Carsten Nicolai was born in 1965 in Karl-Marx-Stadt (now Chemnitz) in Saxony in East Germany. He studied landscape architecture at the Technical University of Dresden and graduated with a diploma in 1990.

While still a student, Nicolai began exhibiting as a self-taught visual artist in informal, artist-run contexts, at a time when private galleries were effectively not permitted in the GDR. These early presentations laid the groundwork for his first connection with Galerie Eigen + Art, which would later become one of his longstanding gallery relationships.

In the immediate post reunification years, Nicolai also became an active cultural organiser. Together with other cultural practitioners, he co-founded and for many years ran the Chemnitz art and culture centre VOXXX on the Kaßberg, widely regarded as one of the city's earliest independent cultural initiatives of the period.

In 1994, Nicolai founded the label noton.archiv für ton und nichtton, later known as NOTON. In 1999, NOTON merged with the Chemnitz label RasterMusic under the name Raster-Noton, operating until 2017. Within a few years, the label became internationally recognised and, alongside A Musik and Mille Plateaux, was regarded as a key German platform for experimental electronic music. As a member (and co-founder) of the Raster-Noton label he was responsible for the acclaimed CD series 20 to 2000 that went on to win the Golden Nica at Prix Ars Electronica in 2000. In 2017, Raster-Noton was announced to split back into its predecessor labels, and Nicolai has since again released his musical work and collaborations independently via NOTON.

Under the moniker Alva Noto, Nicolai is regarded as one of the best known figures in contemporary electronic music. His musical work reflects aspects of his broader artistic practice, particularly its reductive approach and its engagement with signs, acoustics, and visual structures. Nicolai has performed and created installations at many of the world's most prestigious spaces including the Guggenheim in New York, the SFMOMA in San Francisco, the Centre Pompidou in Paris, Modern Art Oxford, the NTT in Tokyo, the Tate Modern in London and the Venice Biennale. His musical projects include collaborations with Ryōji Ikeda, Mika Vainio, Iggy Pop, Blixa Bargeld, Michael Nyman, and Ryūichi Sakamoto. In 2009, Nicolai wrote the opera Sparkie: Cage and Beyond in collaboration with Michael Nyman. In 2015, Nicolai co-scored the music for Alejandro González Iñárritu's The Revenant, together with Ryūichi Sakamoto. The score was nominated for a Golden Globe, BAFTA, Grammy and Critics' Choice Movie Awards. In 2018, he created the sound design for Iñárritu's groundbreaking VR project "Carne y Arena" (Flesh and Sand). In 2022, he received the German Documentary Film Music Award at DOK.fest Munich.

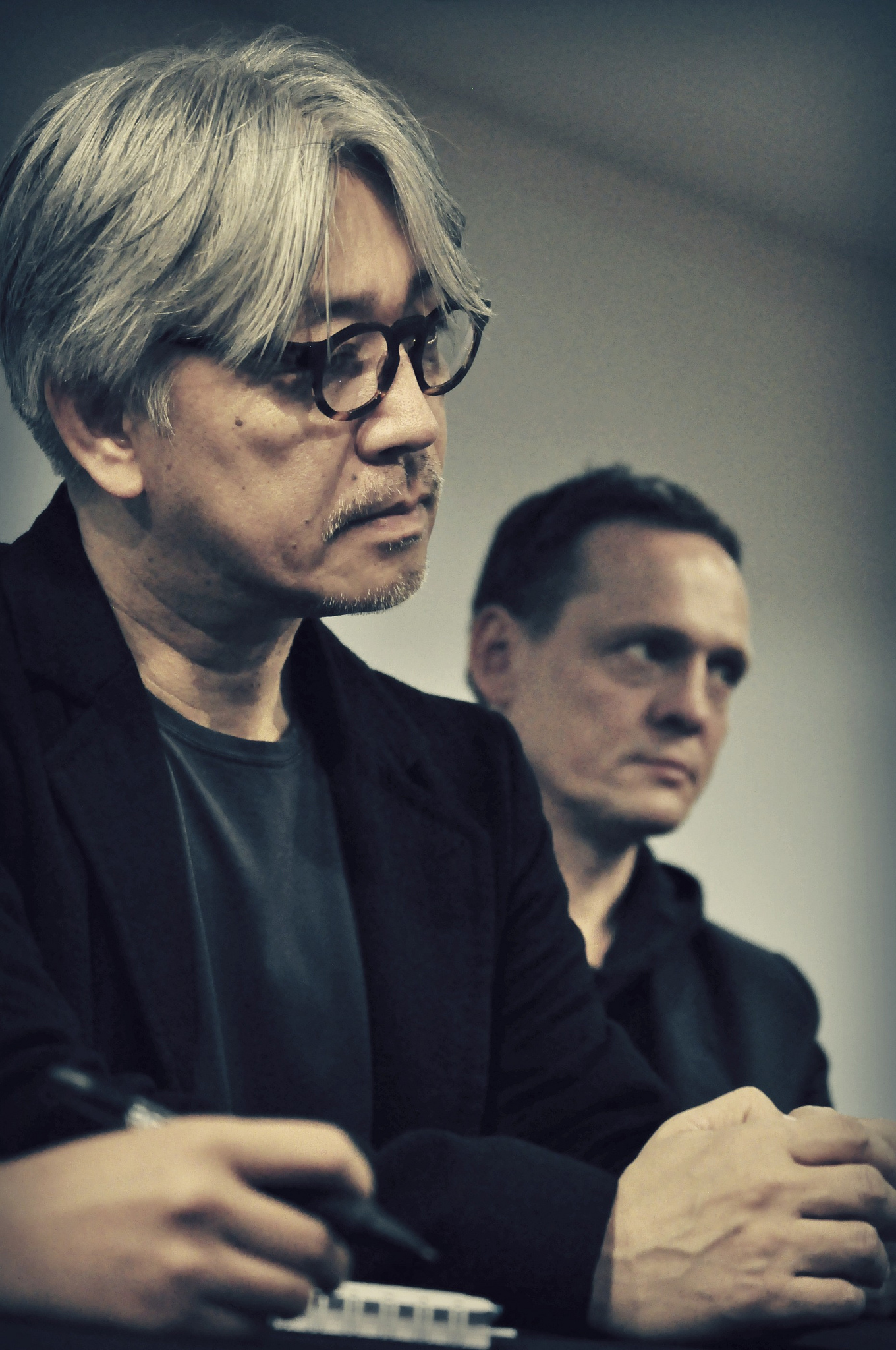
Nicolai with longtime collaborator Ryuichi Sakamoto, in May 2012

Parallel to his formative work in experimental electronic music, Carsten Nicolai also established himself internationally as a visual artist. Drawing on scientific reference systems, Nicolai explores mathematical patterns such as grids and codes, error and random structures, as well as the phenomenon of self organization. His work spans visual art, sound, and installations based practices. Following his participation in documenta X (1997) and the 49th and 50th Venice Biennale (2001 and 2003), his works entered private and public collections and were presented in exhibitions at major museums and galleries worldwide. Notable solo exhibitions include Schirn Kunsthalle Frankfurt (anti reflex, 2005), Neue Nationalgalerie Berlin (syn chron, 2005), Berlinische Galerie (tele, 2018), Kunstsammlungen Nordrhein Westfalen (parallax symmetry, 2019), and Haus der Kunst Munich (transmitter / receiver – the machine and the gardener, 2022). In 2007, on the occasion of his solo exhibition at Zurich's Haus Konstruktiv, he received the Zurich Art Prize, and in the same year he was awarded a fellowship at the Villa Massimo in Rome. In 2013, Nicolai participated as a visual artist in Biennale Documenta, an official collateral show of the 55th Venice Biennale.

Nicolai has held a professorship in art with a focus on digital and time-based media at the Dresden Academy of Fine Arts since 2015. He lives and works in Berlin.

== Discography ==
=== Albums ===
==== Solo ====
as Alva Noto
- 2000 Prototypes (Mille Plateaux)
- 2001 Transform (Mille Plateaux)
- 2007 Xerrox Vol.1 (Raster-Noton)
- 2008 Unitxt (Raster-Noton)
- 2009 Xerrox Vol.2 (Raster-Noton)
- 2011 Univrs (Raster-Noton)
- 2015 Xerrox Vol.3 (Raster-Noton)
- 2018 Unieqav (Noton)
- 2020 Xerrox Vol.4 (Noton)
- 2021 HYbr:ID I (Noton)
- 2023 HYbr:ID II (Noton)
- 2024 HYbr:ID III (Noton)
- 2024 Xerrox Vol.5 (Noton)

as Aleph-1

- 2007 Aleph-1 (iDeal)

as noto

- 1996 Spin (Noton)
- 1997 Infinity (Noton)
- 1997 Infinity (Endless Loop Edition) (Noton)
- 1998 Kerne (Noton)
- 1998 Polyfoto (Noton)
- 1999 Time..dot (Noton)
- 1999 Empty Garden, Inside Out (Noton)
- 2000 Telefunken (Noton)
- 2002 Endless Loop (e, f, g, h) (Noton)
- 2002 Autorec (Noton)
- 2003 Sonar (Endless Edition) (Noton)

==== Collaborations ====
with Ryuichi Sakamoto
- 2002 Vrioon (Raster-Noton)
- 2005 Insen (Raster-Noton)
- 2006 Revep (Raster-Noton)
- 2006 Insen Live (Raster-Noton)
- 2008 utp_ (Raster-Noton)
- 2011 Summvs (Raster-Noton)
- 2015 The Revenant Milan Records
- 2018 Glass (Noton)
- 2019 Two (Live At Sydney Opera House) (Noton)
- 2026 12 Conversations (Noton)

with Ryoji Ikeda, as Cyclo

- 2001 Cyclo. (Raster-Noton)
- 2011 Cyclo.id (Raster-Noton)
- 2017 Cyclo. (Noton)
- 2017 Cyclo.id (Noton)

with Mika Vainio

- 1997 mikro makro (Noton)
- 2001 wohltemperiert (Noton)
- 2018 Live 2002 (Noton)

with Scanner

- 2001 Uniform

with Blixa Bargeld, as ANBB

- 2010 Ret Marut Handshake (Raster-Noton)
- 2010 Mimikry (Raster-Noton)

with Opiate (Thomas Knak), as Opto

- 2001 Opto Files (Raster-Noton)
- 2004 Opto: 2nd (Hobby Industries)

with Zeitkratzer

- 2008 Zeitkratzer & Carsten Nicolai: Electronics (Zeitkratzer Records)

with Anne-James Chaton and Andy Moor

- 2012 Décade (Raster-Noton)

with Anne-James Chaton, as Alphabet

- 2019 Alphabet (Noton)

=== EPs ===
as Alva Noto
- 2005 Transrapid (Raster-Noton)
- 2005 Transvision (Raster-Noton)
- 2005 Transspray (Raster-Noton)
- 2020 Unieqav Remixes, featuring reworks by Fatima Al Qadiri, Ben Frost, JASSS, Florian Kupfer, Luis Da Silva (Noton)

with Olaf Bender (Byetone), as Diamond Version

- 2012 EP1 (Mute)
- 2012 EP2 (Mute)
- 2013 EP3 (Mute)
- 2013 EP4 (Mute)
- 2013 EP5 (Mute)
- 2014 CI (Mute)

with Iggy Pop and Tarwater

- 2016 Leaves of Grass (Morr Music)

=== Compilations ===
- 2006 For (Line)
- 2010 For 2 (Line)

== Accolades ==
- 2003: Scholarship of Villa Aurora, Los Angeles
- 2007: Zurich Art Prize
- 2007: Scholarship of Villa Massimo, Rome
- 2012: Giga-Hertz Prize for Electronic Music of the ZKM Center for Art and Media Karlsruhe (together with Ryoji Ikeda)
- 2015: Grand Prize of the Japan Media Arts Festival, Tokyo

== See also ==
- List of ambient music artists
- List of intelligent dance music artists
- List of sound artists
