= Insen =

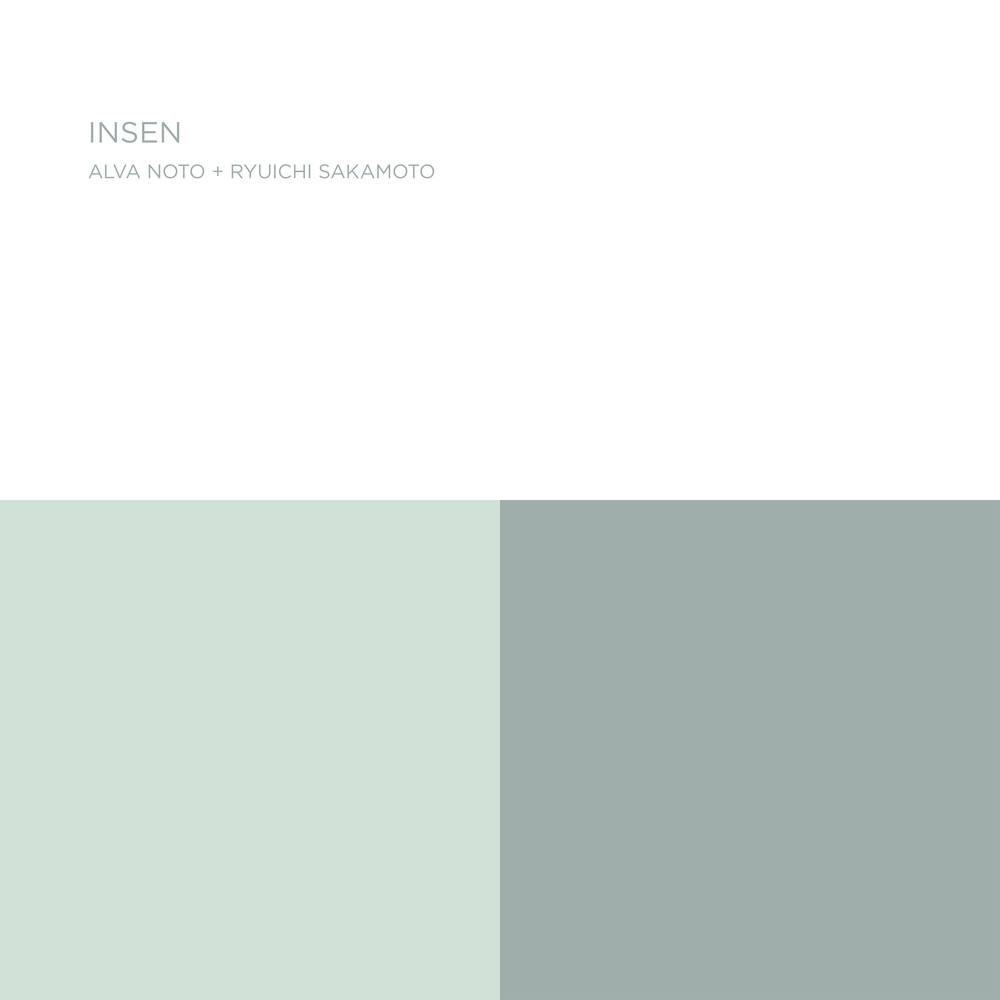

Studio album by Alva Noto and Ryuichi Sakamoto
- Released: 20 March 2005
- Studio: Villa Aurora, Pacific Palisades, Studio Berlin
- Genre: Electronic
- Length: 43:15
- Label: Raster-Noton r-n065
- Producer: Alva Noto

Alva Noto and Ryuichi Sakamoto chronology
Vrioon (2002)	Insen (2005)	Revep (2006)

Professional ratings
Review scores
Source	Rating
AllMusic	4/5 stars

Insen is the second collaboration album between Japanese composer Ryuichi Sakamoto and German electronic artist Carsten Nicolai (here credited as Alva Noto). It was released on 20 March 2005 via Raster-Noton label.

== Overview ==
The album's core sound is a blend of Sakamoto's impressionist piano melodies and Nicolai's digitally processed beats and sounds. Released in 2005 by Nicolai's Raster-Noton label, it follows the duo's debut album Vrioon.

== Reception ==
Insen is heir to Vrioon (2003), Alva Noto's collaboration with Japanese multi-instrumentalist Ryuichi Sakamoto. Both represent something of a departure from the ascetic bent of their peers. Both explore the potential for interaction and tension between electronic and acoustic instrumentation, the latter taking form in Sakamoto's piano. This relationship lies at the core of Insen and continues Vrioon's cool melancholia in subtler, even more streamlined fashion. If each part of the marriage were isolated into constituent parts, they might prove too clinical or precious, but together a delicate vibrancy is created. The air-borne reverberations of the acoustic piano combine, impact and dissolve with digital loops, prods and waverings.

—Colin Buttimer, BBC

== Track listing ==
1. "Aurora" 8:52
2. "Morning" 5:27
3. "Logic Moon" 6:50
4. "Moon" 6:07
5. "Berlin" 6:17
6. "Iano" 6:53
7. "Avaol" 2:52

== Personnel ==
- Ryuichi Sakamoto – piano
- Alva Noto – electronics
