= Ryoji Ikeda =

Japanese visual and musical artist

Ryoji Ikeda 池田 亮司
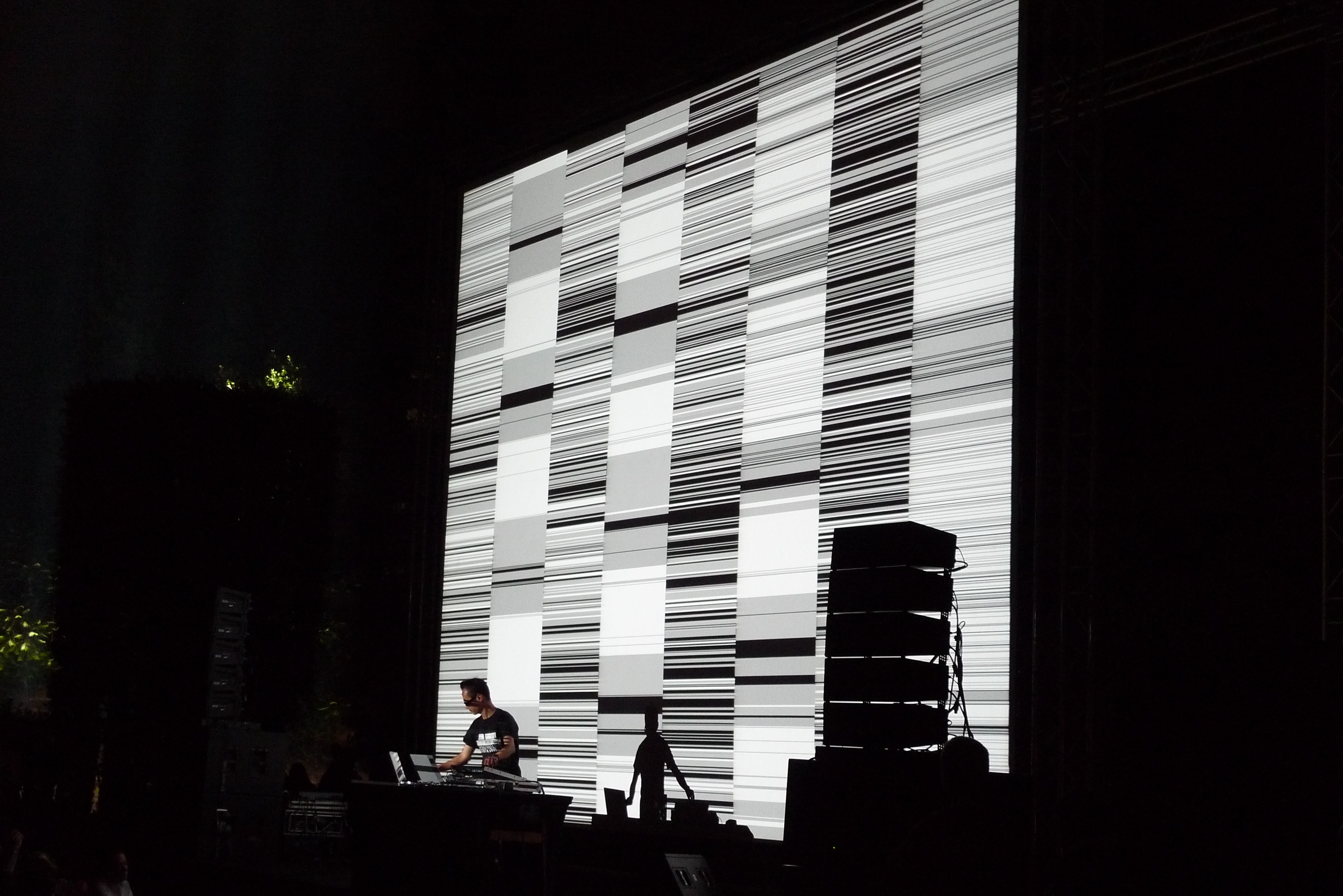

Background information
- Born: 8 July 1966 (age 60); Gifu, Gifu Prefecture, Japan
- Occupations: artist; musician
- Years active: 1995–present
- Website: ryojiikeda.com

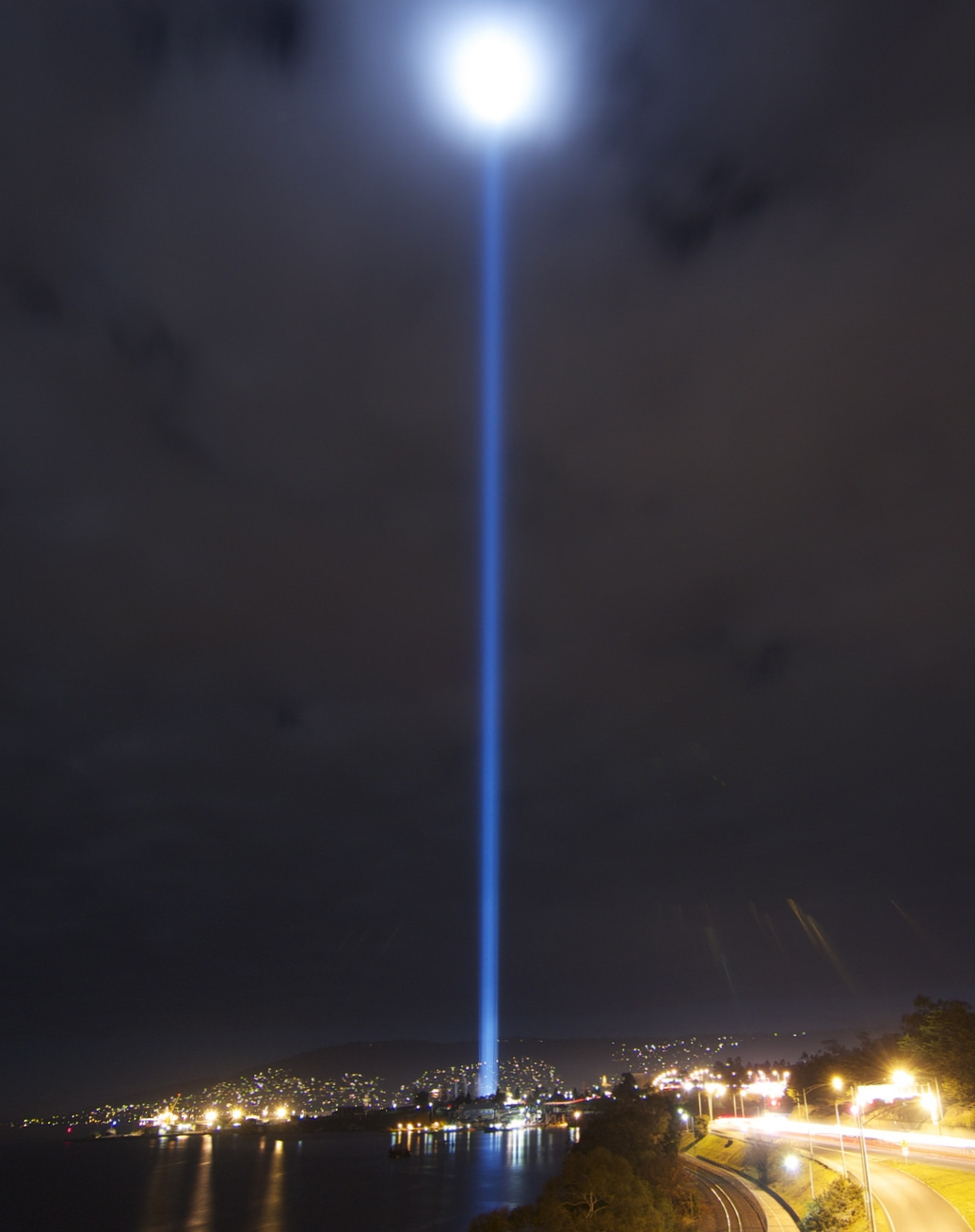
Ikeda's sound and light installation Spectra illuminates the night sky every winter solstice at the Museum of Old and New Art (MONA) in Hobart, Tasmania, Australia.

Ryoji Ikeda (池田 亮司 Ikeda Ryōji, born 8 July 1966) is a Japanese visual and sound artist who currently lives and works in Paris, France. Ikeda's music is concerned primarily with sound in a variety of "raw" states, such as sine tones and noise, often using frequencies at the edges of the range of human hearing. Rhythmically, Ikeda's music is highly imaginative, exploiting beat patterns and, at times, using a variety of discrete tones and noise to create the semblance of a drum machine. His work also encroaches on the world of ambient music and lowercase; many tracks on his albums are concerned with slowly evolving soundscapes, with little or no sense of pulse.

== Early life and education ==
Ryoji Ikeda was born in Gifu, Gifu Prefecture, Japan in 1966.

== Career ==
In addition to working as a solo artist, he has also collaborated with, among others, Carsten Nicolai (under the name "Cyclo.") and the art collective Dumb Type. His work matrix won the Golden Nica Award in 2001.

In 2004, the dormant Saarinen-designed TWA Flight Center (now JetBlue Terminal 5) at JFK Airport briefly hosted an art exhibition called Terminal 5 curated by Rachel K. Ward and featuring the work of 18 artists including Ikeda. The show featured work, lectures and temporary installations drawing inspiration from the idea of travel — and the terminal's architecture. The show was to run from October 1, 2004 to January 31, 2005 — though it closed abruptly after the building itself was vandalized during the opening party.

In May – June 2011 a presentation of three of the artist's immersive audio/visual projects, The Transfinite, was exhibited at the Park Avenue Armory.

In 2014, Ikeda was awarded the Prix Ars Electronica Collide@CERN 2014. As a result, he began his residency at CERN in July 2014 until 2015, during which he developed supersymmetry and micro | macro.

Ikeda was one of the artists, designers and architects presented in the group show Entangle / Physics and the Artistic Imagination (2018-11-16 - 2019-04-07) at Bildmuseet, Umeå University, Sweden.

== Discography ==
=== Recordings ===
- 1000 fragments (cci recordings, 1995 & Raster-Noton, 2008)
- +/- (Touch, 1996)
- time and space (Staalplaat, 1998)
- 0 °C (Touch, 1998)
- Mort Aux Vaches (Mort Aux Vaches, 1999 & 2002)
- 99: Variations For Modulated 440 Hz Sinewaves (Raster-Noton, 1999)
- matrix (Touch, 2000)
- . (with Carsten Nicolai as Cyclo.; Raster-Noton, 2001)
- op. (Touch, 2002)
- dataplex (Raster-Noton, 2005)
- test pattern (Raster-Noton, 2008)
- dataphonics (Dis Voir, 2010)
- id (with Carsten Nicolai as Cyclo.; Raster-Noton, 2011)
- supercodex (Raster-Noton, 2013)
- Live at White Cube (with Christian Marclay; The Vinyl Factory, White Cube, 2015)
- The Solar System (The Vinyl Factory, 2015)
- code name: A to Z (The Vinyl Factory, 2017)
- music for percussion (The Vinyl Factory, 2017)
- music for percussion (codex | edition, 2018)
- music for installations vol.1 (codex | edition, 2021)
- music for installations vol.2 (codex | edition, 2022)
- ultratronics (NOTON, 2022)

=== As Part of Dumb Type ===
- S/N (Newsic 1995)
- Teji Furuhashi / Dumb Type - 1985-1994 (Foil Records, 1996)
- OR (Foil Records, 1998)
- Memorandum (CCI Recordings, 2000)

=== Compilations ===
- "Preamble", Silence (Spiral, 1993)
- "Radio-Range", "Zone 3", "Zone 4", "Zone 1" & "Preamble (For Silence)", Document 02 - Sine (Dorobo, 1995)
- "Untitled", Statics (cci recordings, 1995)
- "Headphonics 1/1", Mesmer Variations (Ash International, 1995)
- "Untitled 071295", A Fault in the Nothing (Ash International, 1996)
- "What's Wrong", "Test No. 1" & "Abstructures", Atomic Weight (Iridium, 1996)
- "One Minute", Tulpas (Selektion, 1997)
- "Headphonics 0/0", Touch Sampler 2 (Touch, 1997)
- "Untitled", RRR 500 (RRRecords, 1998)
- "Interference", Meme (Meme, 1998)
- "Interference 001", Chill Out (Sabotage Recordings, 1998)
- "[0(zero)degrees] Installation", Just About Now (V227, 1998)
- "Interference 003", Modulation & Transformation 4 (Mille Plateaux, 1999)
- "C ::Coda (For T.F.)", ONE :SOUND 001: 00:00-50:00 (One Percent, 1999)
- "The Great American Broadcast", End ID (Digital Narcis Corporation,. Ltd, 1999)
- "Zero Degrees [3]", Sonar 99 (So Dens, 1999)
- "Zero Degrees [3]", Microscopic Sound (Caipirinha Productions, 1999)
- "Zero Degrees", Prix Ars Electronica CyberArts 2000 (Ars Electronica Center, 2000)
- "Matrix (For An Anechoic Room)", Touch 00 (Touch, 2000)
- "0* :: Zero Degrees (1)", Sonic Boom: The Art of Sound (Hayward Gallery, 2000)
- "Cyclo cycle" (as Ikeda), New Forms - Compilation (Raster-Noton, 2000)
- "Untitled (For Disney)", Disney Age @ D_100 Cafe (Walt Disney Records, 2001)
- "ringtone_1 / ringtone_2" & "unobtainable", Ringtones (Touch, 2001)
- "One Minute", An Anthology Of Noise & Electronic Music / First A-Chronology (Sub Rosa, 2002)
- "Spectra II", Frequenzen [Hz] / Frequencies [Hz] (Hatje Cantz, 2002)
- "Untitled 020402", KREV X - The Kingdoms of Elgaland-Vargaland, 1992–2002 (Ash International, 2002)
- "Abstructures", Ju-Jikan: 10 Hours of Sound From Japan (23five, San Francisco Museum of Modern Art, 2002)
- "0’12’’32" & "0’12’’34", Raster-Noton. Archiv 1 (Wire Magazine, Raster-Noton, 2003)
- "Spectra II Edit", Frequencies [Hz] (Raster-Noton, 2003)
- "3’33", Festival Voor Nieuwe Muziek > Happy New Ears 2004 (Happy New Ears, 2004)
- "Untitled #25", Touch 25 (Touch, 2006)
- "data.vortex", Mind The Gap Volume 62 (Gonzo Circus, 2006)
- "0’12’’32" & "0’12’’34", Notations Archiv 1 (Raster-Noton, 2006)
- "Data.Syntax (Uit Dataplex)", Festival Voor Nieuwe Muziek > Hapy New Ears 2007 (Gonzo Circus, 2007)
- "Headphonics 0/1 (Original Mix)", Dissonance Promo (Beatport Promotion, 2008)
- "Back In Black", Recovery (Fractured Recordings, 2008)
- "Test Pattern 0101", 14 Tracks: Between The Wires (Boomkat, 2010)
- "Dataphonics 10 Structure", Qwartz 7 (TRAD>D, 2011)
- "Supercodex 20", 14 Tracks: Digital Diaspora (Boomkat, 2014)
- tracks 1993–2011 (codex | edition, 2018)

== Publications ==
- formula [book + DVD] (NTT Publishing, 2002 & Forma, 2005)
- V≠L (Éditions Xavier Barral, 2008)
- +/- [the infinite between 0 and 1] (Esquire Magazine Japan Co. Ltd, 2009)
- dataphonics book+cd (Éditions DIS VOIR, 2010)
- id (with Carsten Nicolai as Cyclo.; gestalten, 2011)
- datamatics book (Charta, 2012)
- Ryoji Ikeda: micro | macro, 2015. Exhibition Catalogue. (ZKM Karlsruhe, NINO Druck, Neustadt/Weinstraße, 2015)
- Ryoji Ikeda | continuum (Éditions Xavier Barral, 2018)

== Solo exhibitions ==
2002

- db, NTT InterCommunication Center (ICC), Tokyo, JP (curated by Minoru Hatanaka)

2007

- data.tron [prototype], De Vleeshal, Middelburg, NL

2008

- datamatics, Yamaguchi Center for Arts and Media (YCAM), JP (curated by Kazunao Abe)
- spectra, dream amsterdam 2008, Amsterdam, NL
- data.tron, MIC Toi Rerehiko, Media and Interdisciplinary Arts Centre, Auckland, NZ
- V≠L, Le Laboratoire, Paris, FR (curated by Caroline Naphegyi)

2009

- data.tron [8K enhanced version], Ars Electronica Center, Linz, AT
- +/- [the infinite between 0 and 1], Museum of Contemporary Art Tokyo, JP (curated by Yuko Hasegawa)
- data.tron, Ikon Gallery, Birmingham, UK (curated by Nigel Prince)

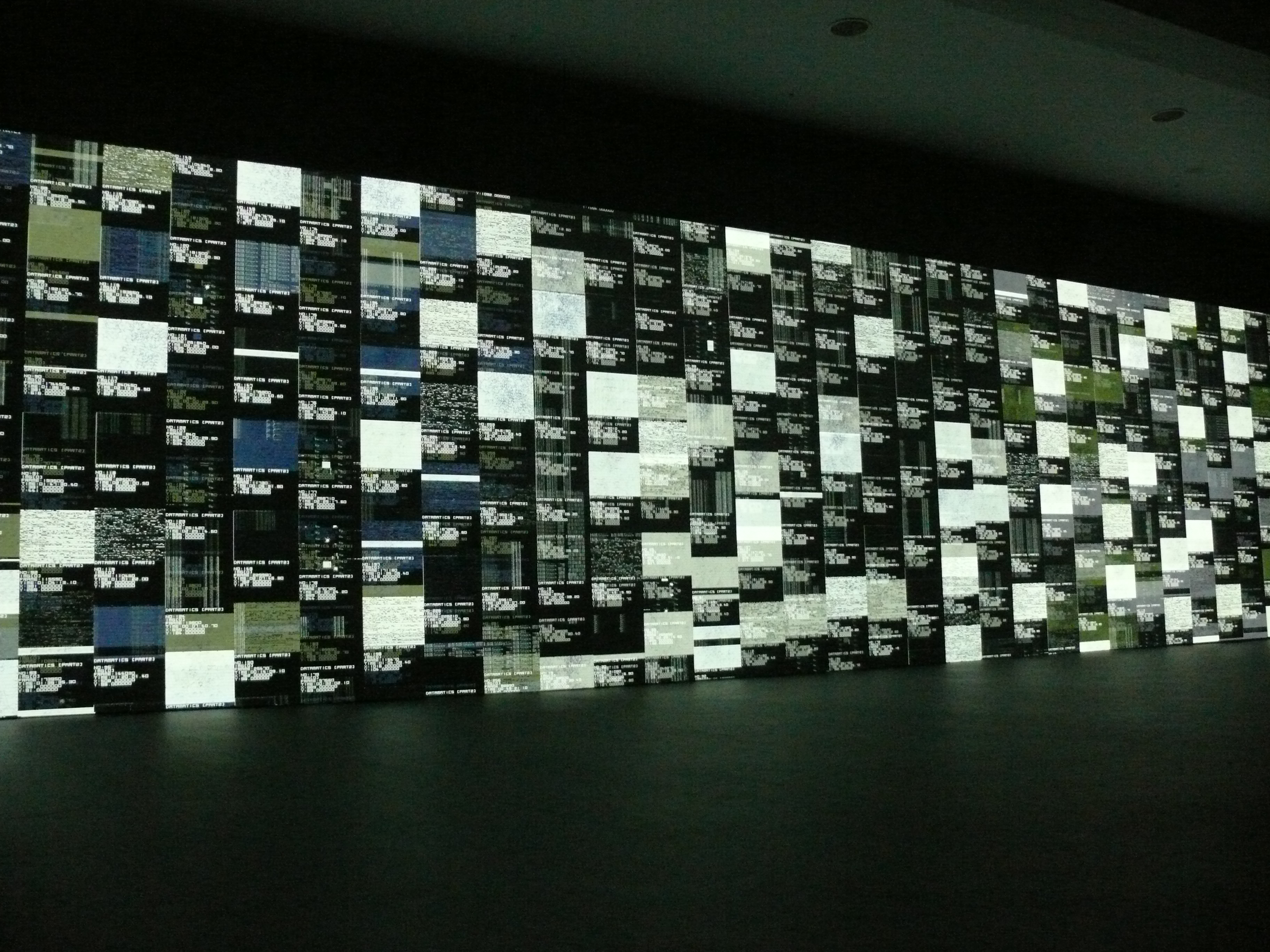
data.tron by Ikeda on show in transmediale 10, Berlin, Germany

2010

- spectra [barcelona], Grec Barcelona Festival and Sonár, Barcelona, ES
- the transcendental, French Institute Alliance Française, New York, US
- test pattern [nº3], Théâtre de Gennevilliers, FR

2011

- the transfinite, Park Avenue Armory, New York, US (curated by Kristy Edmunds)
- datamatics, Museo de Arte, Universidad Nacional de Colombia, Bogotá, CO (curated by Maria Belen Saez de Ibarra)

2012

- db, Hamburger Bahnhof, Berlin, DE (curated by Ingrid Buschmann and Gabriele Knapstein)
- datamatics, LABoral Centro de Arte y Creación Industrial, Gijón, ES (curated by Benjamin Weil)
- data.anatomy [civic], KRAFTWERK, Berlin, DE
- Ryoji Ikeda, DHC/ART, Montréal, CA (curated by John Zeppetelli)

2013

- data.scan [nº1-9], MU and STRP Biennale, Eindhoven, NL
- test pattern [nº4], FRAC Franche- Comté, Besançon, FR
- test pattern [nº5], Carriageworks/ISEA2013/VividSydney, Sydney, AU
- data.tron [3 SXGA+ version], Wood Street Galleries, Pittsburgh, US
- data.path, Espacio Fundación Telefónica, Madrid, ES
- systematics, Gallery Koyanagi, Tokyo, JP

2014

- supersymmetry, Yamaguchi Center for Arts and Media (YCAM), Yamaguchi, JP
- C⁴I [screening version], Musée d’art contemporain de Montréal, CA
- supersymmetry, le lieu unique, Nantes, FR
- test pattern [times square], Times Square, New York, US
- Ryoji Ikeda, Salon 94, New York, US
- test pattern [nº6], Red Bull Music Academy – Spiral Hall, Tokyo, JP
- Ryoji Ikeda, House of Electronic Arts Basel (HeK), CH

2015

- data.tron/data.scan, SCAD Museum of Art, Savannah, US
- supersymmetry, The Vinyl Factory, London, UK
- micro | macro, ZKM, Karlsruhe, DE
- datamatics, Espai d’art contemporani de Castelló, ES
- supersymmetry, KUMU Art Museum, Tallinn, EE

2016

- data.matrix [nº1-10], Wood Street Galleries, Pittsburgh, US
- data.scape, ICC Sydney, Sydney, AU

2017

- A [For 100 Cars], Los Angeles

2018

- Ryoji Ikeda | continuum, Centre Pompidou, Paris, FR
- micro | macro, Carriageworks, Sydney, AU
- Ryoji Ikeda: code-verse, Garage Museum of Contemporary Art, Moscow, RU
- Ryoji Ikeda, Eye Filmmuseum, Amsterdam, NL

2021

- Ryoji Ikeda, 180 The Strand, London, UK

2023

- Ryoji Ikeda, Amos Rex, Helsinki, Finland

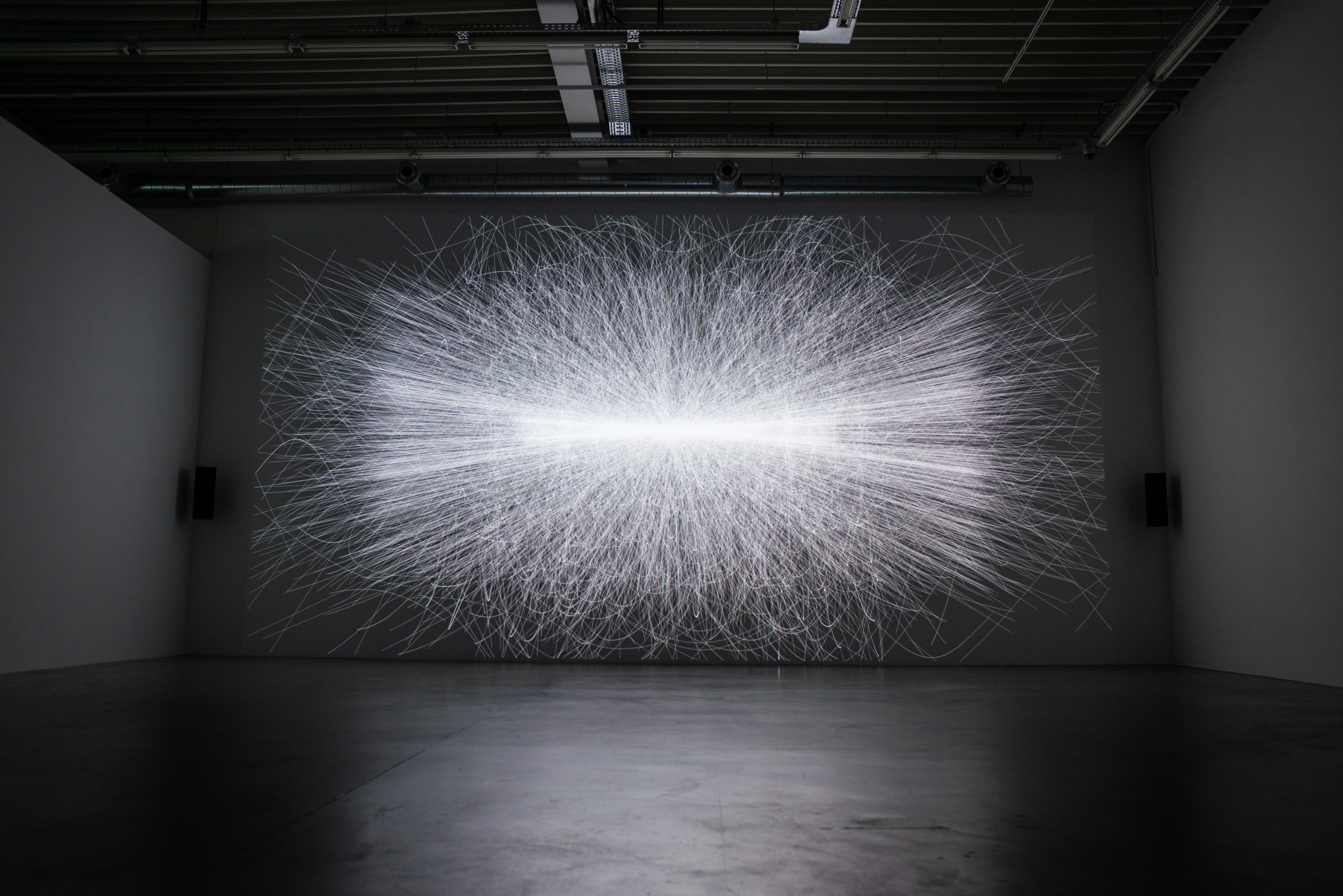
Data-verse 3 exhibited in the Almine Rech gallery in Brussels

2024

- Ryoji Ikeda, Almine Rech, Brussels, Belgium
- Ryoji Ikeda, ERM, Tartu, Estonia

=== 2025 ===
- Ryoji Ikeda: data-verse, High Museum of Art, Atlanta, Georgia

== Other references ==
- Jennings, Gabrielle. Abstract Video, The Moving Image In Contemporary Art 2015. University of California Press.
- Fairley, Gina. “Superposition: Ryoji Ikeda” Visual Arts Hub. Retrieved 2 February 2017. http://visual.artshub.com.au/news-article/reviews/visual-arts/gina-fairley/superposition- ryoji-ikeda-249435
- O’Hagan, Sean. “Spectra: The Dazzling Column of Light Over London” The Guardian. 5 August 2014. https://www.theguardian.com/artanddesign/2014/aug/05/ryoji-ikeda-spectra-first-world- war-artangel
- Harris, Mark. “London, Ryoji Ikeda” Art Forum. Retrieved 2 February 2017. http://artforum.com/picks/id=52366
- Holmes, Natalie. “Bending Waves of Sound and Light” New Scientist. 16 February 2012. https://www.newscientist.com/blogs/culturelab/2012/02/bending-waves-of-sound-and-light.html
- Zeppetelli, John. “Ryoji Ikeda: a survey” Domus. 26 October 2012. http://www.domusweb.it/en/art/2012/10/26/ryoji-ikeda-a-survey.html
- Budick, Ariella. “Intimacy on a grand scale” Financial Times. 27 May 2011.
- Mignon, Oliver. “Ryoji Ikeda Gallery Koyanagi” Art Forum. March 2011.
- Smith, Steve. “The Noises of Modern Life, Ending in a Bombardment” The New York Times. 12 September 2010 https://www.nytimes.com/2010/09/13/arts/music/13fiaf.html?_r=0
- Tcherepnin, Sergei. “Materialisations of the Immaterial” The Brooklyn Rail. 9 July 2009. www.brooklynrail.org/2009/07/music/materializations-of-the-immaterial
