= Xerrox Vol.2 =

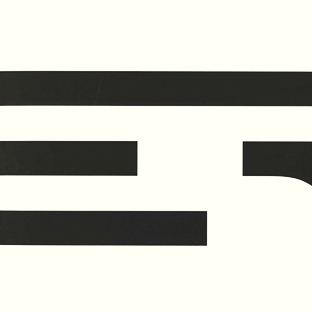

Studio album by Alva Noto
- Released: January 2009
- Recorded: Otranto / Aca Florida, New Smyrna Beach / Berlin 2008, mixed in Berlin Lager Studio.
- Genre: Electronic
- Length: 66:16
- Label: Raster-Noton

Alva Noto chronology
Unitxt (2008)	Xerrox Vol.2 (2009)	Univrs (2011)

Professional ratings
Review scores
Source	Rating
Allmusic	4/5 stars
PopMatters	7/10
Resident Advisor	4/5 stars
Sputnikmusic	3.7/5

Xerrox Vol. 2 is the sixth studio album by German electronic artist Alva Noto. On this record, the author turns to a list of contemporary musicians, including Michael Nyman, Stephen O'Malley, and Ryuichi Sakamoto. The record is the second part of his Xerrox quintet of albums.

== Reception ==
Timothy Gabriele of Pop Matters wrote "If one could pinpoint the major fault with the latest collection by Carsten Nicolai, better known as Alva Noto to those with a good grasp of what constitutes provocative and exciting experimental music these days, it is that it lacks in surprises. For instance, while Xerrox Vol. 2 is more of a droning, monotonic affair than its predecessor (Xerrox Vol.1 ), with noisier tracks that bleed into one another rather than checker themselves like a decorated circuit breaker, the album’s invocation of stark, often gorgeous cinematic whole notes encompassed by neon spark-plug fuzz should not be the least bit shocking to anyone who owns the first (and slightly more essential) installation in this proposed series of 5 or for anyone who has had his or her ear to the powerlines since the days of Kid606's P.S. I Love You".

James Reeves of Residential Advisor stated "At the center of this white noise stands Carsten Nicolai, AKA Alva Noto, and co-founder of Raster-Noton. Thanks to the label's recent string of top-shelf releases, I'm back in their quiet corner. Xerrox Vol. 2 picks up where Vol. 1 left off, this time pushing samples from Michael Nyman, Stephen O'Malley and Ryuichi Sakamoto through Noto's Xerrox software... If you believe in this sound, Xerrox Vol. 2 is an essential release, and if you simply need a soundtrack for a dead February day or pacing the floors at three in the morning, you can't do much better".

== Track listing ==
1. "Xerrox Phaser Acat 1" –12:11
2. "Xerrox Rin" – 0:51
3. "Xerrox Soma" – 7:11
4. "Xerrox Meta Phaser" – 6:23
5. "Xerrox Sora" – 6:54
6. "Xerrox Monophaser 1" – 8:04
7. "Xerrox Monophaser 2" – 5:31
8. "Xerrox Teion" –2:03
9. "Xerrox Teion Acat" – 5:26
10. "Xerrox Tek Part 1" – 5:28
11. "Xerrox Monophaser 3" – 6:14

== Credits ==
- Design – Carsten Nicolai
- Sounds (all Xerrox software samples by) – Carsten Nicolai
