= Transvision (EP) =

EP by Alva Noto
- Released: 2005
- Recorded: 2002–2004
- Studio: R-N Modul Berlin, In Transit
- Genre: Electronic, abstract, minimal, experimental
- Length: 21:09
- Label: Raster Noton r-n 62

Alva Noto chronology
Transrapid (2004)	Transvision (2005)	Transspray (2006)

Transvision is an extended play by German electronic artist Alva Noto. It was released in 2005 via the Raster Noton label.

== Background ==
This is the second part of the transall triptych that, according to the artist, respectively deals with one of three interrelated themes: the increased speed of information flow, utopias, and the fragmentation of ideas. The record is accompanied by an essay written by theorist and filmmaker Kodwo Eshun who turns on ideas of freedom, intuition, and possibility in the service of erecting a monument (sic). His most attractively cogent observation states that the enigma of the sonic makes life vivid.

== Track listing ==
All tracks are written by Alva Noto.

No.	Title	Length
1.	"Remodel"	5:33
2.	"J"	5:52
3.	"Postfabric" (Sounds by Richard Chartier)	3:30
4.	"10"	6:16
Total length:		21:09

== Personnel ==
- Carsten Nicolai – sounds
- Kodwo Eshun – liner notes
- Nibo, R-N Modul Berlin – design
