= Transrapid (EP) =

EP by Alva Noto
- Released: 2004
- Recorded: 2002–2004
- Studio: R-N Modul Berlin, In Transit
- Genre: Electronic, abstract, minimal, experimental
- Length: 20:43
- Label: Raster Noton r-n 61

Alva Noto chronology
Transform (2001)	Transrapid (2004)	Transvision (2005)

Transrapid is an extended play by German electronic artist Alva Noto. It was released in 2004 via Raster Noton label.

== Background ==
This is the first part of the transall triptych that, according to the artist, respectively deals with one of three interrelated themes: the increased speed of information flow, utopias, and the fragmentation of ideas. The record is accompanied by an essay written by journalist and author Ulf Poschardt, addressing such issues as the acceleration of art, technology and culture and concluding that a key aspect of the contemporary is the embracing of both speed and stasis.

== Track listing ==
All tracks are written by Alva Noto

No.	Title	Length
1.	"Funkbugfx"	8:29
2.	"Pulse (Xs Version)"	2:32
3.	"Future"	7:15
4.	"Highmatrix"	2:21
Total length:		20:43

== Personnel ==
- Carsten Nicolai – all sounds
- Nibo, R-N Modul Berlin – design
- Ulf Poschardt – liner notes
