= Revep =

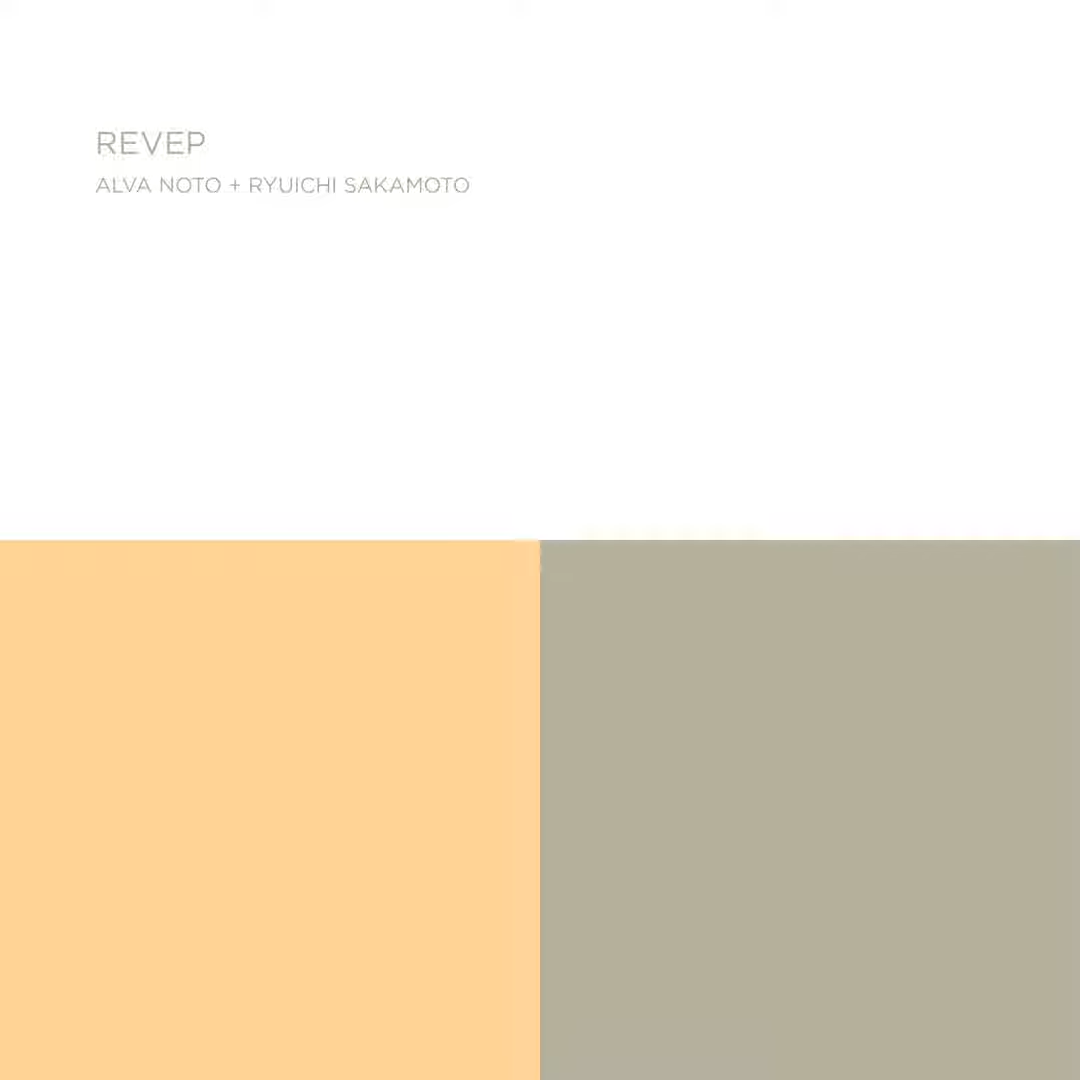

EP by Alva Noto, Ryuichi Sakamoto
- Released: 23 May 2006
- Genre: Electronic
- Length: 19:50
- Label: Raster-Noton r-n 72
- Producer: Carsten Nicolai

Alva Noto, Ryuichi Sakamoto chronology
Insen (2005)	Revep (2006)	utp_ (2008)

Professional ratings
Review scores
Source	Rating
AllMusic	4/5 stars

Revep is the third collaboration record between Japanese composer Ryuichi Sakamoto and German electronic artist Carsten Nicolai (here credited as Alva Noto). This EP continues the series titled the Virus Series. The EP was released on 23 May 2006 via Raster-Noton label.

== Overview ==
The compositions revolve around a collaborative new arrangement of Sakamoto's classic "Merry Christmas Mr. Lawrence", the theme music to the 1983 movie Merry Christmas Mr. Lawrence starring David Bowie, Takeshi Kitano, and Ryuichi Sakamoto himself.

== Reception ==
Turn the volume up loud enough while listening to opening track ‘Siisx’ and you’ll hear unmistakable white noise. A mistake or recording problem? Not likely, nothing is an accident with these two virtuosos. Clicks, taps, clacks and taps skitter across the soundscape as Ryuichi’s expertly knocks away at the ebony and ivory. Don’t be surprised if you feel your throat tighten and a frosty sensation spread through your anterior lobes. Music? Art? Whatever it is this is less about listening and more about feeling. ... This isn’t by any means an album to let loose and rock out to. In fact it is a refreshing change from all the electro sounds Tiefschwarz et al are dressing up as click, glitch and minimal. Play this at a party and you’ll be hung, drawn and quartered but turn it up at the next annual meeting of the chin strokers society and you’ll be hailed a hero. By all means listen to this CD numerous times but just be careful because there is a reason the album is only three songs long. Any more of this cleverly crafted masterpiece and you’d never want to waste your time with any of that other stuff posing as music.

—Nick Lawrence, Higher Frequency

== Track listing ==
No.	Title	Length
1.	"Siisx"	7:24
2.	"Mur"	8:14
3.	"Ax Mr.L."	4:18
Total length:		19:50

Notes: "Ax Mr.L." refers to a track that was composed by Mr. Sakamoto in 1983 for the movie Merry Christmas Mr. Lawrence.

== Personnel ==
- Ryuichi Sakamoto – piano, songwriter
- Carsten Nicolai – producer, additional sounds
- Alva Noto – songwriter

== See also ==
- Merry Christmas Mr. Lawrence (instrumental)
- Ryuichi Sakamoto discography
