= Raster-Noton =

German record label

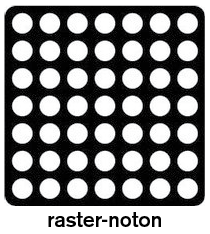
- Founded: 1996
- Founder: Olaf Bender, Carsten Nicolai and Frank Bretschneider
- Genre: Electronic; Glitch; Experimental
- Country of origin: Germany
- Location: Chemnitz
- Official website: raster-media.net

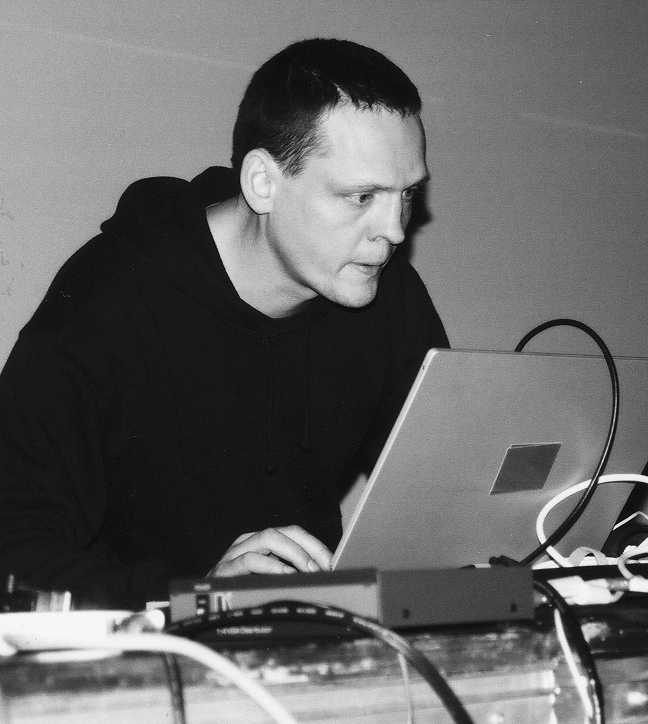
Carsten Nicolai as Noto, playing live at MUTEK 2004

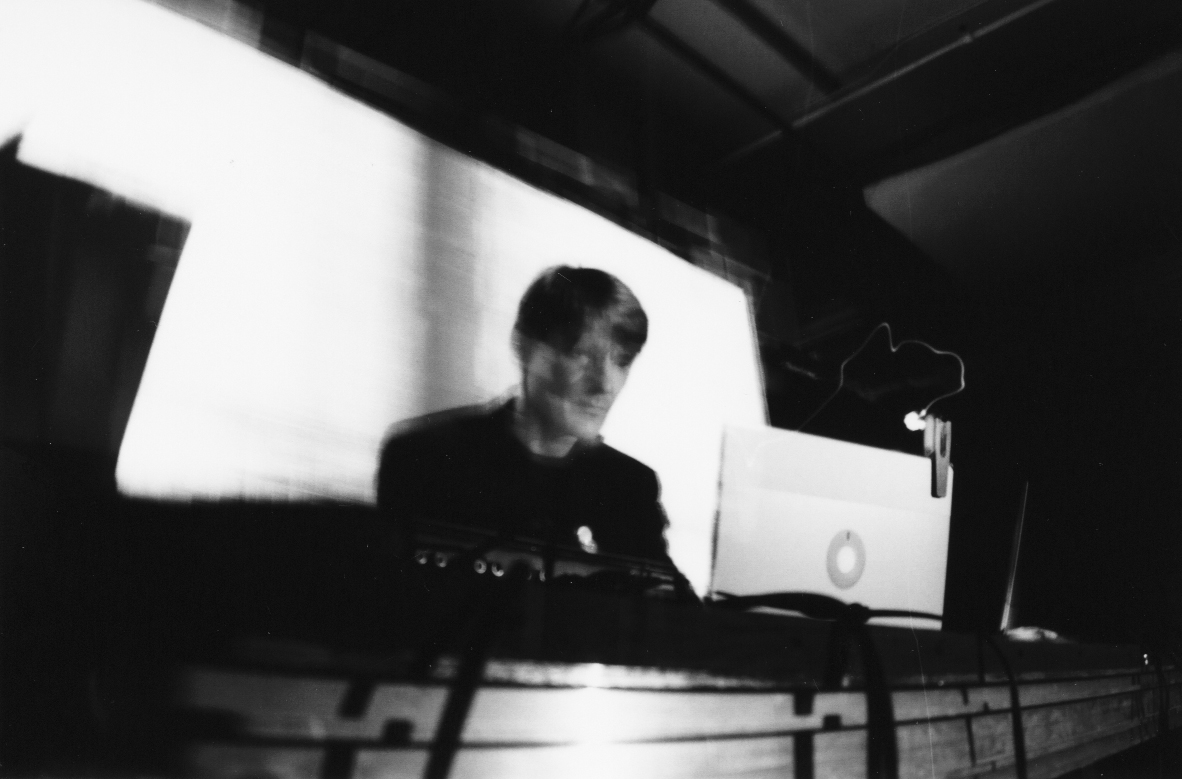
Olaf Bender as Byetone, playing live at MUTEK 2004

Raster-Noton was a German electronic music record label. It was established in 1999 in Chemnitz, Germany. By the mid 2010s, it had become known as "one of Europe’s most revered and reliable hubs for experimental electronic music, IDM and audio-visual art."

Raster-Noton emerged from the fusion of Rastermusik, founded by Olaf Bender and Frank Bretschneider in 1996, and Noton (Archiv für Ton und Nichtton), a sub-label that was run by Carsten Nicolai.

The label focused on the overlapping border areas of pop, art, and science, releasing music albums, publications, and installation works focused on rhythmic, minimal electronic music.

In 2017, the label split into two entities: Raster, to be run by Bender, and Noton, focusing on Nicolai's output.

== Artists ==
- Alva Noto
- Blixa Bargeld
- Anne-James Chaton
- Aoki Takamasa
- Atom™
- Blir
- Byetone
- Carl Michael von Hausswolff
- Ivan Pavlov (CoH)
- Cosey Fanni Tutti
- Cyclo
- Elph
- Emptyset
- Frank Bretschneider (Komet)
- Frans de Waard, Roel Meelkop and Peter Duimelinks (Goem)
- Grischa Lichtenberger
- Herve Boghossian
- Ilpo Väisänen
- Jesse Osborne-Lanthier
- Kangding Ray
- Kim Cascone
- Komet
- Kyborg
- Kyoka
- Marc Behrens
- Mark Fell
- Mitchell Akiyama
- Modul
- Mokira
- NHK
- Nibo
- Noto
- Opiate
- Mika Vainio (Ø)
- Pixel
- Franz Pomassl
- Produkt
- Richard Chartier
- Robert Lippok
- Ryoji Ikeda
- Ryuichi Sakamoto
- Robin Rimbaud (Scanner)
- Jens Massel (Senking)
- Signal
- SND
- Taylor Deupree
- Vladislav Delay
- William Basinski
- Wolfgang Voigt

== Catalogue ==
| Title | Artist | Cat No | Year |
| mikro makro | φ + noto | r-n 006 | 1997 |
| stud stim | goem | r-n 007 | 1997 |
| infinity | noto | r-n 008 | 1997 |
| shortwavemusic | w.basinski | vyr 012 | 1998 |
| final ballet | m.behrens | r-n 013 | 1998 |
| blue cube | kim cascone | r-n 014 | 1998 |
| empty garden | noto | ltd 009 | 1999 |
| telefunken | noto | r-n 032 | 2000 |
| open close open | robert lippok | r-n 037 | 2001 |
| strom | carl michael von hausswolff | r-n 038 | 2001 |
| wohltemperiert | φ + noto | r-n 039 | 2001 |
| Cyclo. | ryoji ikeda + noto | vyr 041 | 2001 |
| (o)acis | various artists | r-n 042 | 2001 |
| endless loop (e, f, g, h) | noto | vyr 045 | 2002 |
| the river | w.basinski | r-n 048 | 2002 |
| con.duct. spc.trm | nibo | r-n 049 | 2002 |
| Vrioon | alva noto + ryuichi sakamoto | r-n 050 | 2002 |
| frequencies (Hz) | various artists | ltd 008 | 2003 |
| transrapid | alva noto | vyr 051 | 2003 |
| weltecho (box) | carsten nicolai | r-n 052 | 2003 |
| sonar endless loop edition III | alva noto | vyr 055 | 2003 |
| archiv.1 | various artists | r-n 056 | 2004 |
| transall: transrapid | alva noto | r-n 061 | 2004 |
| transall: transvision | alva noto | r-n 062 | 2005 |
| transall: transspray | alva noto | r-n 063 | 2005 |
| Insen | alva noto + ryuichi sakamoto | r-n 065 | 2005 |
| transall collector's box | alva noto | r-n 066 | 2005 |
| leech | carl michael von hausswolff | r-n 067 | 2006 |
| Dataplex | Ryoji Ikeda | r-n 068 | 2005 |
| notations archiv 1 | various artists | r-n 070 | 2006 |
| Revep | alva noto + ryuichi sakamoto | r-n 072 | 2006 |
| stabil | kangding ray | r-n 073 | 2006 |
| set your center between your parts in order to | pixel | r-n 074 | 2006 |
| incidence | richard chartier | r-n 075 | 2006 |
| insen live | alva noto + ryuichi sakamoto | r-n 076 | 2006 |
| list | Senking | r-n 077 | 2007 |
| Xerrox Vol.1 | alva noto | r-n 078 | 2007 |
| Transform | alva noto | r-n 079 | 2008 |
| archiv.2 | various artists | r-n 080 | 2007 |
| Plastic Star | Byetone | r-n 081 | 2008 |
| Rhythm | Frank Bretschneider | r-n 082 | 2007 |
| Aiff-tiff | various artists | r-n 083 | 2008 |
| Fades | Carsten Nicolai | r-n 084 | 2007 |
| Strings | CoH | r-n 085 | 2007 |
| Aleph-1 | Aleph-1 | r-n 087 | 2007 |
| Spare Parts | Pomassl | r-n 088 | 2007 |
| 1000 Fragments | Ryoji Ikeda | r-n 089 | 2008 |
| CoH plays Cosey | CoH + Cosey Fanni Tutti | r-n 091 | 2008 |

=== 20' to 2000 ===

20' to 2000 is a monthly series of twelve CDs released over the course of 1999, with each month's artist contributing a 20-minute project expressing "possibly a manifest of the millennium". Each disc was packaged in a thin plastic slipcase with a hollow core. A separate kit containing twelve magnets fit into the core and allowed the individual discs to be joined into one set (pictured). This series received the "Golden Nica" award from Ars Electronica in 2000.

| month | artist |
|---|---|
| January | Komet |
| February | Ilpo Väisänen |
| March | Ryoji Ikeda |
| April | CoH |
| May | Olaf Bender, Byetone |
| June | Jens Massel, Senking |
| July | Thomas Brinkmann |
| August | Robin Rimbaud (Scanner) |
| September | Alva Noto (Noto) |
| October | Mika Vainio |
| November | Wolfgang Voigt |
| December | ELpH: elph.zwölf |
