= List of accolades received by The Revenant =

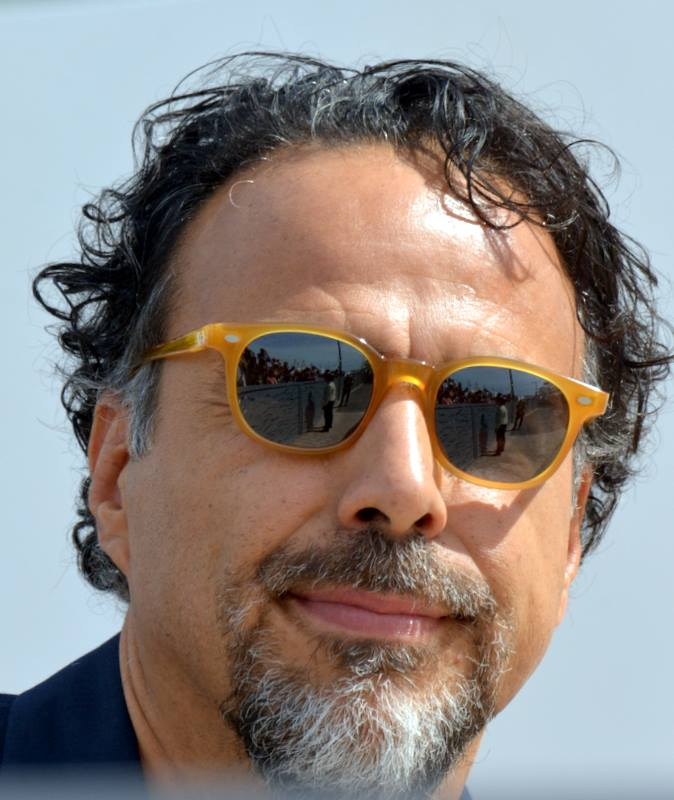
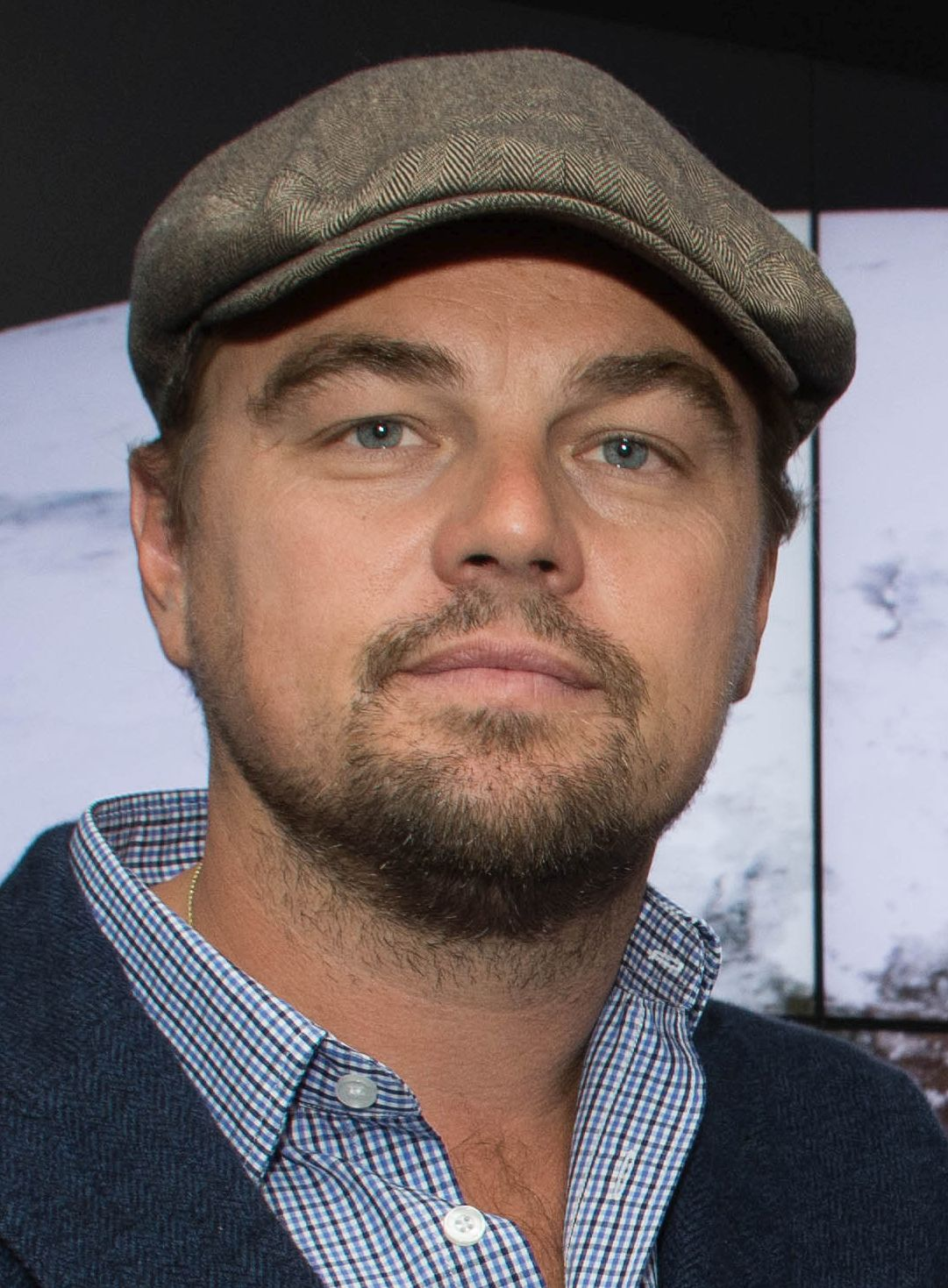
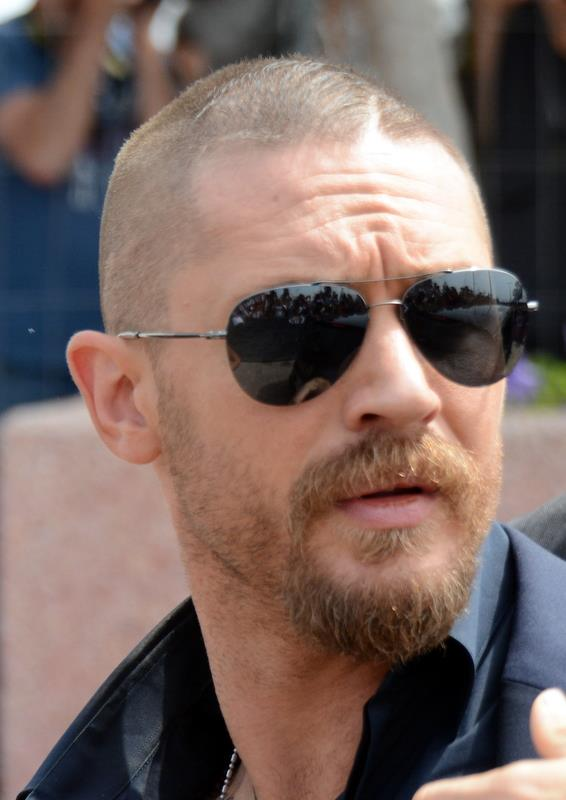
- Alejandro G. Iñárritu (left) received critical appraisal for his direction, Leonardo DiCaprio (middle) and Tom Hardy (right) for their portrayals of Hugh Glass and John Fitzgerald, respectively.
Accolades
Award	Won	Nominated	Standing
AACTA International Awards	1	3
AARP Annual Movies for Grownups Awards	0	1
Academy Awards	3	12
American Cinema Editors Awards	0	1
Alliance of Women Film Journalists	1	3
Annie Awards	1	1
Art Director Guild Awards	1	1
Austin Film Critics Association	0	2
Boston Society of Film Critics	1	1
British Academy Film Awards	5	8
Chicago Film Critics Association	1	5
Cinematography Guild Awards	1	1
Critics' Choice Movie Awards	2	9
Dallas–Fort Worth Film Critics Association	5	6	Runner-up
Detroit Film Critics Society	0	3
Directors Guild of America Awards	1	1
Dorian Awards	1	1
Florida Film Critics Circle	0	3	Runner-up
Golden Globe Awards	3	4
Houston Film Critics Society	3	6	London Film Critics' Circle	1	5
Los Angeles Film Critics Association	1	1	Runner-up
MTV Movie Awards	1	4
Online Film Critics Society	0	4
Phoenix Critics Circle	0	3
Phoenix Film Critics Society	2	6
Producers Guild of America Awards	0	1
San Diego Film Critics Society	1	4	Runner-up
San Francisco Film Critics Circle	0	5
Satellite Awards	1	5
Saturn Awards	0	2
Screen Actors Guild Awards	1	1
Seattle Film Critics	1	9
St. Louis Film Critics Association	3	7
Vancouver Film Critics Circle	0	3
Visual Effects Society	3	3
Washington D.C. Area Film Critics Association	2	6
- Total number of awards and nominations
Totals	63	183
- References

The Revenant is a 2015 American epic western action drama film directed, co-produced and co-written by Alejandro G. Iñárritu. The screenplay by Iñárritu and Mark L. Smith is based in part on Michael Punke's novel of the same name, inspired by the experiences of frontiersman Hugh Glass in 1823. It stars Leonardo DiCaprio as Glass, and co-stars Tom Hardy, Domhnall Gleeson and Will Poulter. The film premiered at TCL Chinese Theatre on December 16, 2015. 20th Century Fox released it theatrically in the United States on December 25 as a limited release, expanding on January 8, 2016. The film was a commercial success, grossing $533 million worldwide on a budget of $135 million.

On the review aggregator Rotten Tomatoes, The Revenant holds a rating of 80%, based on 326 reviews, with an average rating of 7.9/10. The film garnered awards and nominations in a variety of categories with particular praise for its direction, cinematography and the performances of DiCaprio and Hardy. The Revenant received twelve nominations at the 88th Academy Awards, including Best Picture. It won Best Director (Iñárritu), Best Cinematography (Emmanuel Lubezki), and Best Actor (DiCaprio). DiCaprio also received awards in the Best Actor category at the 73rd Golden Globe Awards, 69th British Academy Film Awards, and 22nd Screen Actors Guild Awards. Iñárritu also won Best Director at the 68th Directors Guild of America Awards, and at the 69th British Academy Film Awards.

== Accolades ==
Award	Category	Recipient(s)	Result	Ref.
AACTA International Awards	Best Film		Nominated	
AACTA International Awards	Best Direction	Alejandro G. Iñárritu	Nominated	
AACTA International Awards	Best Lead Actor	Leonardo DiCaprio	Won	
AARP Annual Movies for Grownups Awards	Best Director	Alejandro G. Iñárritu	Nominated	
Academy Awards	Best Picture	Arnon Milchan, Steve Golin, Alejandro G. Iñárritu, Mary Parent and Keith Redmon	Nominated	
Academy Awards	Best Director	Alejandro G. Iñárritu	Won	
Academy Awards	Best Actor	Leonardo DiCaprio	Won	
Academy Awards	Best Supporting Actor	Tom Hardy	Nominated	
Academy Awards	Best Cinematography	Emmanuel Lubezki	Won	
Academy Awards	Best Costume Design	Jacqueline West	Nominated	
Academy Awards	Best Film Editing	Stephen Mirrione	Nominated	
Academy Awards	Best Makeup and Hairstyling	Siân Grigg, Duncan Jarman and Robert Pandini	Nominated	
Academy Awards	Best Production Design	Production Design: Jack Fisk; Set Decoration: Hamish Purdy	Nominated	
Academy Awards	Best Sound Editing	Martin Hernández and Lon Bender	Nominated	
Academy Awards	Best Sound Mixing	Jon Taylor, Frank A. Montaño, Randy Thom and Chris Duesterdiek	Nominated	
Academy Awards	Best Visual Effects	Rich McBride, Matthew Shumway, Jason Smith and Cameron Waldbauer	Nominated	
ACE Eddie Awards	American Cinema Editors Award for Best Edited Feature Film – Dramatic	Stephen Mirrione	Nominated	
Alliance of Women Film Journalists	Best Director	Alejandro G. Iñárritu	Nominated	
Alliance of Women Film Journalists	Best Actor	Leonardo DiCaprio	Won	
Alliance of Women Film Journalists	Best Cinematography	Emmanuel Lubezki	Nominated	
Annie Awards	Outstanding Achievement in Character Animation in a Live Action Production	Matt Shumway, Adrian Millington, Blaine Toderian, Alex Poei, and Kai-Hua Lan	Won	
Art Directors Guild Awards	Excellence in Production Design for a Period Film	Jack Fisk	Won	
ASC Awards	Outstanding Achievement in Cinematography in Theatrical Releases	Emmanuel Lubezki	Won	
Austin Film Critics Association	Best Actor	Leonardo DiCaprio	Nominated	
Austin Film Critics Association	Best Cinematography	Emmanuel Lubezki	Nominated	
Boston Society of Film Critics	Best Actor	Leonardo DiCaprio	Won	
British Academy Film Awards	Best Film	Steve Golin, Alejandro G. Iñárritu, Arnon Milchan, Mary Parent and Keith Redmon	Won	
British Academy Film Awards	Best Actor in a Leading Role	Leonardo DiCaprio	Won	
British Academy Film Awards	Best Direction	Alejandro G. Iñárritu	Won	
British Academy Film Awards	Best Film Music	Ryuichi Sakamoto and Carsten Nicolai	Nominated	
British Academy Film Awards	Best Cinematography	Emmanuel Lubezki	Won	
British Academy Film Awards	Best Editing	Stephen Mirrione	Nominated	
British Academy Film Awards	Best Makeup and Hair	Siân Grigg, Duncan Jarman, and Robert Pandini	Nominated	
British Academy Film Awards	Best Sound	Chris Duesterdiek, Jon Taylor, Frank A. Montaño, Randy Thom, Martin Hernández, and Lon Bender	Won	
Chicago Film Critics Association	Best Picture		Nominated	
Chicago Film Critics Association	Best Director	Alejandro G. Iñárritu	Nominated	
Chicago Film Critics Association	Best Actor	Leonardo DiCaprio	Won	
Chicago Film Critics Association	Best Cinematography	Emmanuel Lubezki	Nominated	
Chicago Film Critics Association	Best Editing	Stephen Mirrione	Nominated	
Cinema Audio Society	Best Motion Picture Sound Mixing	Chris Duesterdiek, Jon Taylor, Frank A. Montano, Randy Thom, Conrad Hensel, Michael Miller and Geordy Sincavage	Won	
Critics' Choice Awards	Best Picture		Nominated	
Critics' Choice Awards	Best Director	Alejandro G. Iñárritu	Nominated	
Critics' Choice Awards	Best Actor	Leonardo DiCaprio	Won	
Critics' Choice Awards	Best Supporting Actor	Tom Hardy	Nominated	
Critics' Choice Awards	Best Cinematography	Emmanuel Lubezki	Won	
Critics' Choice Awards	Best Editing	Stephen Mirrione	Nominated	
Critics' Choice Awards	Best Makeup		Nominated	
Critics' Choice Awards	Best Score	Ryuichi Sakamoto and Carsten Nicolai	Nominated	
Critics' Choice Awards	Best Visual Effects		Nominated	
Dallas–Fort Worth Film Critics Association	Top Ten Films		Won	
Dallas–Fort Worth Film Critics Association	Best Director	Alejandro G. Iñárritu	Won	
Dallas–Fort Worth Film Critics Association	Best Actor	Leonardo DiCaprio	Won	
Dallas–Fort Worth Film Critics Association	Best Supporting Actor	Tom Hardy	3rd Place	
Dallas–Fort Worth Film Critics Association	Best Cinematography	Emmanuel Lubezki	Won	
Dallas–Fort Worth Film Critics Association	Best Musical Score	Ryuichi Sakamoto and Carsten Nicolai and Bryce Dessner	Won	
Detroit Film Critics Society	Best Film		Nominated	
Detroit Film Critics Society	Best Director	Alejandro G. Iñárritu	Nominated	
Detroit Film Critics Society	Best Actor	Leonardo DiCaprio	Nominated	
Directors Guild of America Awards	Outstanding Directing – Feature Film	Alejandro G. Iñárritu	Won	
Dorian Awards	Best Actor	Leonardo DiCaprio	Won	
Empire Awards	Best Film		Won	
Empire Awards	Best Director	Alejandro G. Iñárritu	Nominated	
Empire Awards	Best Actor	Leonardo DiCaprio	Nominated	
Empire Awards	Best Make-Up and Hairstyling		Nominated	
Empire Awards	Best Visual Effects		Nominated	
Florida Film Critics Circle	Best Director	Alejandro G. Iñárritu	Nominated	
Florida Film Critics Circle	Best Actor	Leonardo DiCaprio	Runner-up	
Florida Film Critics Circle	Best Cinematography	Emmanuel Lubezki	Nominated	
Golden Eagle Award	Best Foreign Language Film	The Revenant	Won	
Golden Globe Awards	Best Motion Picture – Drama		Won	
Golden Globe Awards	Best Director	Alejandro G. Iñárritu	Won	
Golden Globe Awards	Best Actor – Motion Picture Drama	Leonardo DiCaprio	Won	
Golden Globe Awards	Best Original Score	Ryuichi Sakamoto and Carsten Nicolai	Nominated	
63rd MPSE Golden Reel Award	Best Sound Editing - Sound Effects and Foley in a Feature Film	Martin Hernández	Won	
63rd MPSE Golden Reel Award	Best Sound Editing - Music in a Feature Film	Martin Hernández	Nominated	
63rd MPSE Golden Reel Award	Best Sound Editing - Dialogue and ADR in a Feature Film	Martin Hernández	Nominated	
Golden Trailer Awards	Best Drama		Nominated	
Golden Trailer Awards	Most Original		Nominated	
Golden Trailer Awards	Best Sound Editing		Won	
Golden Trailer Awards	Best Teaser		Nominated	
Houston Film Critics Society	Best Picture		Nominated	
Houston Film Critics Society	Best Director	Alejandro G. Iñárritu	Won	
Houston Film Critics Society	Best Actor	Leonardo DiCaprio	Nominated	
Houston Film Critics Society	Best Supporting Actor	Tom Hardy	Won	
Houston Film Critics Society	Best Cinematography	Emmanuel Lubezki	Won	
Houston Film Critics Society	Best Original Score	Ryuichi Sakamoto and Carsten Nicolai and Bryce Dessner	Nominated	
Japan Academy Prize	Outstanding Foreign Language Film		Nominated	
Location Managers Guild International Awards	Outstanding Locations in a Period Film	Robin Mounsey and Bruce Brownstein	Won	
London Film Critics' Circle	Film of the Year		Nominated	
London Film Critics' Circle	Actor of the Year	Leonardo DiCaprio	Nominated	
London Film Critics' Circle	Supporting Actor of the Year	Tom Hardy	Nominated	
London Film Critics' Circle	Director of the Year	Alejandro G. Iñárritu	Nominated	
London Film Critics' Circle	British Actor of the Year	Tom Hardy	Won	
Motion Picture Sound Editors	Best Sound Editing: Music in a Feature Film	Martin Hernandez	Nominated	
Motion Picture Sound Editors	Best Sound Editing: Dialogue and ADR in a Feature Film	Lon Bender, Randy Thom, and Martin Hernandez	Nominated	
Motion Picture Sound Editors	Best Sound Editing: Sound Effects and Foley in a Feature Film	Lon Bender, Randy Thom, and Martin Hernandez	Won	
MTV Movie Awards	Best Male Performance	Leonardo DiCaprio	Won	
MTV Movie Awards	True Story		Nominated	
MTV Movie Awards	Best Fight	Leonardo DiCaprio vs. The Bear	Nominated	
MTV Movie Awards	Best Villain	Tom Hardy	Nominated	
Online Film Critics Society	Best Picture		Nominated	
Online Film Critics Society	Best Actor	Leonardo DiCaprio	Nominated	
Online Film Critics Society	Best Editing	Stephen Mirrione	Nominated	
Online Film Critics Society	Best Cinematography	Emmanuel Lubezki	Nominated	
Producers Guild of America Awards	Best Theatrical Motion Picture	Arnon Milchan, Steve Golin, Alejandro G. Iñárritu, Mary Parent and Keith Redmon	Nominated	
San Diego Film Critics Society	Best Director	Alejandro G. Iñárritu	Nominated	
San Diego Film Critics Society	Best Actor	Leonardo DiCaprio	Won	
San Diego Film Critics Society	Best Editing	Stephen Mirrione	Nominated	
San Diego Film Critics Society	Best Cinematography	Emmanuel Lubezki	Runner-up	
San Francisco Film Critics Circle	Best Director	Alejandro G. Iñárritu	Nominated	
San Francisco Film Critics Circle	Best Actor	Leonardo DiCaprio	Nominated	
San Francisco Film Critics Circle	Best Cinematography	Emmanuel Lubezki	Nominated	
San Francisco Film Critics Circle	Best Production Design	Jack Fisk and Hamish Purdy	Nominated	
San Francisco Film Critics Circle	Best Film Editing	Stephen Mirrione	Nominated	
Satellite Awards	Best Film		Nominated	
Satellite Awards	Best Actor	Leonardo DiCaprio	Won	
Satellite Awards	Best Director	Alejandro G. Iñárritu	Nominated	
Satellite Awards	Best Adapted Screenplay	Alejandro G. Iñárritu and Mark L. Smith	Nominated	
Satellite Awards	Best Cinematography	Emmanuel Lubezki	Nominated	
Saturn Awards	Best Action or Adventure Film		Nominated	
Saturn Awards	Best Actor	Leonardo DiCaprio	Nominated	
Screen Actors Guild Awards	Outstanding Performance by a Male Actor in a Leading Role	Leonardo DiCaprio	Won	
St. Louis Film Critics Association	Best Film		Nominated	
St. Louis Film Critics Association	Best Director	Alejandro G. Iñárritu	Nominated	
St. Louis Film Critics Association	Best Actor	Leonardo DiCaprio	Won	
St. Louis Film Critics Association	Best Editing	Stephen Mirrione	Nominated	
St. Louis Film Critics Association	Best Cinematography	Emmanuel Lubezki	Won	
St. Louis Film Critics Association	Best Visual Effects		Nominated	
St. Louis Film Critics Association	Best Scene	Bear Attack	Won	
Teen Choice Awards	Choice Movie Actor: Drama	Leonardo DiCaprio	Won	
Vancouver Film Critics Circle	Best Film		Nominated	
Vancouver Film Critics Circle	Best Actor	Leonardo DiCaprio	Nominated	
Vancouver Film Critics Circle	Best Director	Alejandro G. Iñárritu	Nominated	
Visual Effects Society	Outstanding Supporting Visual Effects in a Photoreal Feature	Rich McBride, Ivy Agregan, Jason Smith, Nicolas Chevallier and Cameron Waldbauer	Won	
Visual Effects Society	Outstanding Animated Performance in a Photoreal Feature	Matthew Shumway, Gaelle Morand, Karin Cooper and Leandro Estebecorena	Won	
Visual Effects Society	Outstanding Compositing in a Photoreal Feature	Donny Rausch, Alan Travix, Charles Lai and TC Harrison	Won	
Washington D.C. Area Film Critics Association	Best Film		Nominated	
Washington D.C. Area Film Critics Association	Best Director	Alejandro G. Iñárritu	Nominated	
Washington D.C. Area Film Critics Association	Best Actor	Leonardo DiCaprio	Won	
Washington D.C. Area Film Critics Association	Best Supporting Actor	Tom Hardy	Nominated	
Washington D.C. Area Film Critics Association	Best Cinematography	Emmanuel Lubezki	Won	
Washington D.C. Area Film Critics Association	Best Editing	Stephen Mirrione	Nominated	
