= Akiko Yano discography =

The discography of a Japanese singer-songwriter Akiko Yano. The list includes materials recorded with other artists.

== Albums ==
=== Studio albums ===
Solo albums

| Year | Title | Album details | Peak chart positions |
| Year | Title | Album details | JPN |
|---|---|---|---|
| 1976 | Japanese Girl | Released: July 25, 1976; Label: Nippon Phonogram | 35 |
| 1977 | Irohanikonpeitō (いろはにこんぺいとう) | Released: August 5, 1977; Label: Nippon Phonogram | 35 |
| 1978 | To Ki Me Ki (ト･キ･メ･キ) | Released: September 5, 1978; Label: Nippon Phonogram | 46 |
| 1980 | Gohan ga Dekitayo (ごはんができたよ) | Released: November 20, 1980; Label: Japan | 31 |
| 1981 | Tadaima. (ただいま｡) | Released: May 1, 1981; Label: Japan | 20 |
| 1982 | Ai ga Nakucha ne. (愛がなくちゃね｡) | Released: June 25, 1982; Label: Japan | 29 |
| 1984 | OSOS (オーエス オーエス, Ōesu Ōesu) | Released: June 25, 1984; Label: Tokuma Japan | 23 |
| 1986 | Tōge no Wagaya (峠のわが家) | Released: February 21, 1986; Label: Midi | 20 |
| 1986 | Brooch | Solo Piano and Vocal Album; Released: September 5, 1986; Label: Midi/Yano Music | 57 |
| 1987 | Granola | Released: November 21, 1987; Label: Midi | 36 |
| 1989 | Welcome Back | Released: April 21, 1989; Label: Midi | 27 |
| 1991 | Love Life | Released: October 25, 1991; Label: Epic/Sony | 21 |
| 1992 | Super Folk Song | Solo Piano and Vocal Album; Released: June 1, 1992; Label: Epic/Sony | 10 |
| 1993 | Love Is Here | Released: June 2, 1993; Label: Epic/Sony | 12 |
| 1994 | Elephant Hotel | Released: October 1, 1994; Label: Epic/Sony | 16 |
| 1995 | Piano Nightly | Solo Piano and Vocal Album; Released: October 21, 1995; Label: Epic/Sony | 21 |
| 1997 | Oui Oui | Released: July 1, 1997; Label: Epic/Sony | 21 |
| 1999 | Go Girl | Released: August 4, 1999; Label: Epic/Sony | 29 |
| 2000 | Home Girl Journey | Solo Piano and Vocal Album; Released: November 1, 2000; Label: Epic/Sony | 38 |
| 2002 | Reverb | Released: March 20, 2002; Label: Epic/Sony | 64 |
| 2004 | Honto no Kimochi (ホントのきもち) | Released: October 27, 2004; Label: Yamaha Music Communications | 34 |
| 2008 | Akiko | Released: October 22, 2008 (simultaneously issued with English Version); Label: Yamaha Music Communications | 28 |
| 2010 | Ongakudō (音楽堂) | Solo Piano and Vocal Album; Released: February 10, 2010; Label: Yamaha Music Communications | 30 |
| 2013 | Yano Akiko, Imawano Kiyoshirō o Utau (矢野顕子、忌野清志郎を歌う) | Released: February 6, 2013; Label: Yamaha Music Communications | 34 |
| 2014 | Tobashite Ikuyo (飛ばしていくよ) | Released: March 26, 2014; Label: Speedstar Records | 34 |
| 2015 | Welcome to Jupiter | Released: September 16, 2015; Label: Speedstar Records | 28 |
| 2017 | Soft Landing | Solo Piano and Vocal Album; Released: November 29, 2017; Label: Speedstar Records | 26 |
| 2018 | Futari Bocchi de Ikou (ふたりぼっちで行こう) | Released: November 28, 2018; Label: Speedstar Records | 27 |
| 2021 | Ongaku wa Okurimono (音楽はおくりもの) | Released: August 25, 2021; Label: Speedstar Records | |

Collaborative albums

| Year | Title | Album details | Peak chart positions |
| Year | Title | Album details | JPN |
|---|---|---|---|
| 1997 | Life Behind TV (with Jeff Bova) | Artist: The Hammonds; Released: July 1, 1997 (simultaneously issued with English Version); Label: Epic/Sony | 87 |
| 2006 | Hajimete no Yano Akiko (はじめてのやのあきこ) (feat. Yosui Inoue, Kiyoshiro Imawano, Hiromi Uehara, Kazumasa Oda, Noriyuki Makihara, Yuki) | Artist: Akiko Yano; Released: March 8, 2006; Label: Yamaha Music Communications | 42 |
| 2007 | Yanokami (with Rei Harakami) | Artist: yanokami; Released: August 8, 2007; Label: Yamaha Music Communications | 24 |
| 2010 | Anata to Utaō (あなたと歌おう) (with Ryoko Moriyama) | Artist: YaMori; Released: July 14, 2010; Label: Yamaha Music Communications | 83 |
| 2011 | Tōku wa Chikai (遠くは近い) (with Rei Harakami) | Artist: yanokami; Released: December 14, 2011 (simultaneously issued with Instrumental Version); Label: Yamaha Music Communications | 58 |
| 2020 | Asteroid and Butterfly (with Hiromitsu Agatsuma) | Artist: Akiko Yano; Released: March 4, 2020; Label: Nippon Columbia | |

=== Live albums ===
Solo albums

| Year | Title | Album details | Peak chart positions |
| Year | Title | Album details | JPN |
|---|---|---|---|
| 1976 | Nagatsuki Kannazuki (長月 神無月) | Released: December 30, 1976; Label: Nippon Phonogram | 60 |
| 1979 | Tokyo wa Yoru no Shichi-ji (東京は夜の七時) | Released: April 25, 1979; Label: Nippon Phonogram | — |
| 1988 | Good Evening Tokyo | Released: May 21, 1988; Label: Midi | 30 |
| 1994 | Demae Concert (出前コンサート) | Released: July 21, 1994; Label: Midi | — |
| 2000 | Twilight: the "LIVE" Best of Akiko Yano | Released: June 21, 2000; Label: Epic/Sony | 84 |
| 2008 | Japanese Girl: Piano Solo Live 2008 (iTunes exclusive) | Released: September 24, 2008 (download only); Released: November 26, 2014 (CD); Label: Yamaha Music Communication | — |
| 2012 | Koya no Yobigoe (荒野の呼び声) | Released: August 8, 2012; Label: Yamaha Music Communication | 79 |
"—" denotes releases that did not chart or was not released

Collaborative albums

| Year | Title | Album details | Peak chart positions |
| Year | Title | Album details | JPN |
|---|---|---|---|
| 2000 | Live Beautiful Songs (with Taeko Onuki, Tamio Okuda, Keiichi Suzuki, Kazufumi Miyazawa) | Artist: Various artists; Released: October 18, 2000; Label: Toshiba EMI | 10 |
| 2011 | Get Together -Live in Tokyo- (with Hiromi Uehara) | Artist: Akiko Yano × Hiromi; Released: November 23, 2011; Label: Universal J | 22 |
| 2017 | ラーメンな女たち -Live in Tokyo- (with Hiromi Uehara) | Artist: Akiko Yano × Hiromi; Released: March 8, 2017; Label: Telarc | — |
| 2024 | Step Into Paradise -Live in Tokyo- (with Hiromi Uehara) | Artist: Akiko Yano × Hiromi; Released: December 6, 2024; Label: Telarc | — |

=== Compilation albums ===
| Year | Title | Album details | Peak chart positions |
| Year | Title | Album details | JPN |
|---|---|---|---|
| 1982 | From Japan to Japan | Label: Tokuma Japan | — |
| 1988 | Home Music | Label: Yano Music | — |
| 1989 | Home Music II | Released: January 1, 1989; Label: Midi | 90 |
| 1989 | Asoko no Akko-chan (あそこのアッコちゃん) | Released: July 25, 1989; Label: Tokuma Japan | — |
| 1990 | Akiko Yano | Released: October 5, 1990; Label: Elektra Nonesuch | — |
| 1992 | On the Air | Released: September 21, 1992; Label: Midi | 88 |
| 1995 | Ai ga Tarinai (愛がたりない) | Released: January 21, 1995; Label: Midi | — |
| 1996 | Hitotsudake: The Very Best of | Released: September 23, 1996; Label: Epic/Sony | 7 |
| 2003 | Piyanoakiko: The Best of Solo Piano Songs | Released: October 1, 2003; Label: Epic/Sony | 66 |
| 2006 | Ima Made no Yano Akiko (いままでのやのあきこ) | Released: August 23, 2006; Label: Sony Music Direct | 97 |
| 2016 | Yano Sanmyaku (矢野山脈) | Released: November 30, 2016; Label: Victor | 24 |

== Singles ==
- "Iro wa Konpeitō" (1977)
- "Ike Yanagida" (1977)
- "Gohan ga Dekita yo" (1980)
- "Harusaki Kobeni" (February 1, 1981) - #3 on the singles chart (Music Labo)
- "Tadaima" (June 1, 1981)
- "Ashita Koso, Anata" (November 25, 1981)
- "Gomennasai Oh Yeah" (1982)
- "Watashi no Nyanko" (1983)
- "Ramen Tabetai" (August 5, 1984)
- "Ai ga Tarinai" (1985)
- "Hana no Yō ni..." (November 21, 1987)
- "David" (October 21, 1990)
- "Bakabon" (January 22, 1990)
- "Super Folk Song" (June 1, 1992)
- "Children in the Summer" (May 1, 1993)
- "Subarashii Hibi" (May 1, 1994)
- "Yume no Hiyoko" (July 1, 1994)
- "Ai ga Areba? (Love Can't Be Blind)" (September 7, 1994)
- "Omoide no Sanpomichi" (October 21, 1995)
- "Harusaki Kobeni" / "Hitotsu Dake" (July 21, 1996)
- "Cream Stew (The Stew)" (May 1, 1997)
- "Home Sweet Home" (March 25, 1998)
- "Oka o Koete" (April 22, 1998)
- "Girlfriends Forever" (May 21, 1999)
- "Hitoribocchi wa Yameta" (July 1, 1999)
- "Dreaming Girl" (March 5, 2002)
- "Atashinchi" (December 3, 2003)
- "Presto" (February 1, 2006)
- "Shiawase na Bakatare" (August 30, 2011)
- "Konyara no Uta" (March 18, 2012)
- "Rilakkuma no Watashi" (August 7, 2013)
- "Ton Poo" (September 5, 2015)
- "Soft Landing" (June 23, 2017)
