= Futurista (Ryuichi Sakamoto album) =

Studio album by Ryuichi Sakamoto
- Released: April 1986
- Recorded: 1985–1986
- Studios: Victor Studio, Onkio Haus
- Genres: Synth-pop; electro-industrial
- Producer: Ryuichi Sakamoto

Ryuichi Sakamoto chronology
Esperanto (1985)	Futurista (1986)	Media Bahn Live (1986)

Futurista (未来派野郎, translates literally as "Futurist Bastard") is a 1986 album by Ryuichi Sakamoto with themed references to the Futurist Movement. "Parolibre" and "Variety Show" include voice recordings of Futurist Filippo Tommaso Marinetti. "G.T. II" contains samples from the song "Legs" by Art of Noise.

== Track listing ==
1. "Broadway Boogie Woogie", lyrics by Peter Barakan
2. "Kodo Kogen"
3. "Ballet Mécanique", lyrics by Akiko Yano, Peter Barakan
4. "G.T. II°", lyrics by Akiko Yano, Peter Barakan
5. "Milan 1909"
6. "Variety Show"
7. "Daikokai - Verso Lo Schermo"
8. "Water Is Life"
9. "Parolibre"
10. "G.T."

== Personnel ==
- Ryuichi Sakamoto – composer, performer, producer, programming, mixing, backing vocals (Ballet Mécanique)
- Bernard Fowler – vocals (Broadway Boogie Woogie, Ballet Mécanique, G.T. II, G.T.)
- Minako Yoshida – vocals (Broadway Boogie Woogie), backing vocals (Daikoukai, Ballet Mécanique)
- Caoli Cano – vocals (Verso Lo Schermo, Parolibre)
- Maceo Parker – alto saxophone (Broadway Boogie Woogie)
- Haruo Kubota – electric guitar (Broadway Boogie Woogie, Ballet Mécanique, G.T. II, G.T.)
- Kenji Suzuki – electric guitar (Broadway Boogie Woogie, Ballet Mécanique)
- Arto Lindsay – electric guitar (Parolibre)
- Shigeki Miyata – co-producer
- Takeshi Fujii – co-producer
- Shigeru Takise – engineering, mixing
- Hiroshi Okura – executive producer
- Tohru Kotetsu – mastering
- Hiromitsu Yoshiya – art direction
