= 1996 (Ryuichi Sakamoto album) =

1996 studio album by Ryuichi Sakamoto

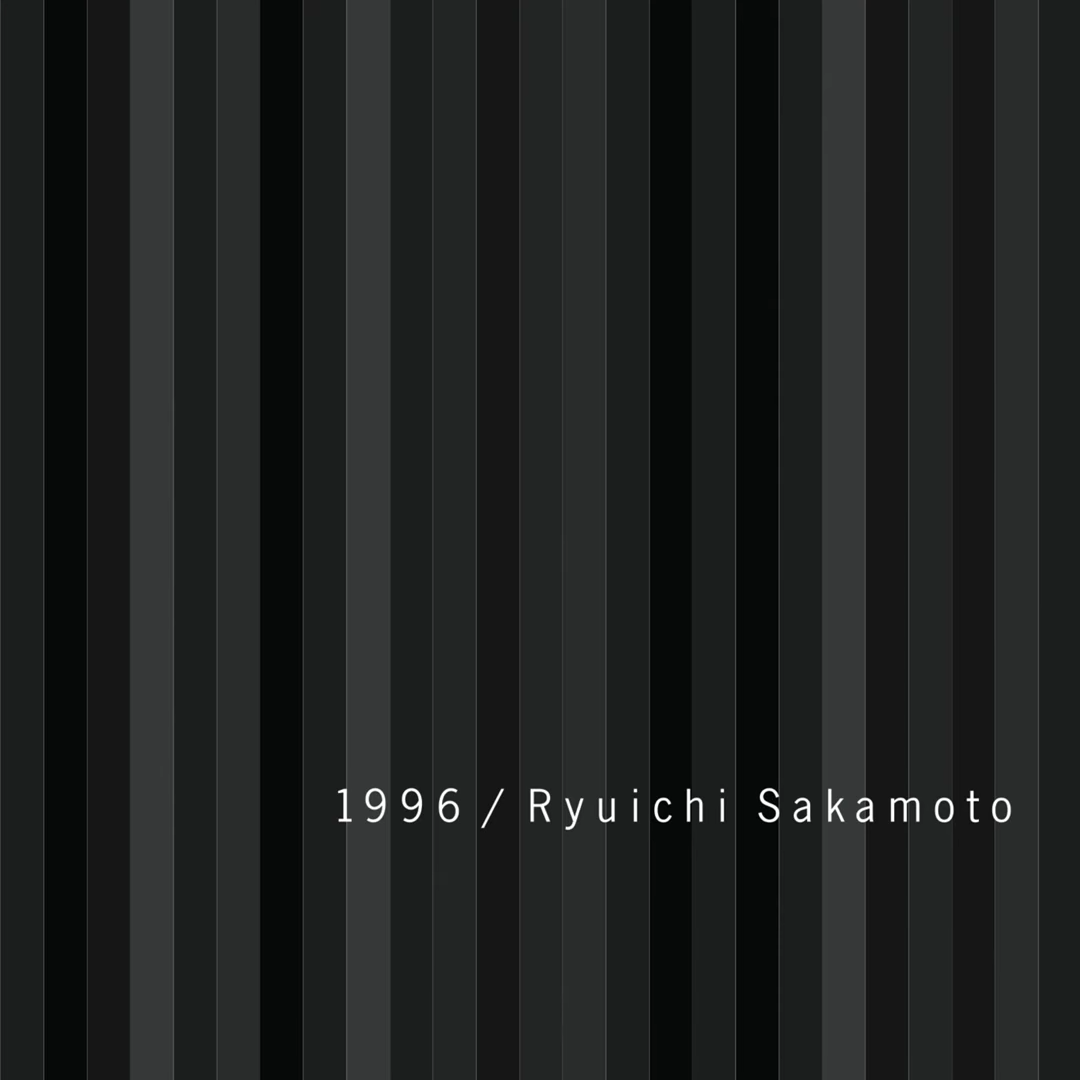

Studio album by Ryuichi Sakamoto
- Released: June 4, 1996
- Studio: Right Track (New York City)
- Genre: Chamber music
- Length: 68:42
- Labels: Güt, For Life, Milan
- Producer: Ryuichi Sakamoto

Ryuichi Sakamoto chronology
Smoochy (1995)	1996 (1996)	Discord (1997)

1996 is a 1996 album by Japanese composer and pianist Ryuichi Sakamoto. It contains a selection of Sakamoto's most popular compositions plus two new compositions, all arranged for a standard piano trio. The arrangement of "Bibo no Aozora" that appears on this album has appeared in several film and television projects; one notable example is the film Babel, whose soundtrack features both the 1996 version and the /04 version of the song.

== Track listing ==
All songs composed by Ryuichi Sakamoto.

No.	Title	Originally from	Length
1.	"A Day a Gorilla Gives a Banana" (ゴリラがバナナをくれる日 Gorira ga Banana wo Kureru Hi)	Previously unreleased	1:40
2.	"Rain"	The Last Emperor (soundtrack), 1987	3:38
3.	"Bibo no Aozora" (美貌の青空, Blue Sky of Beauty)	Smoochy, 1995	6:36
4.	"The Last Emperor"	The Last Emperor (soundtrack), 1987	5:53
5.	"1919"	Previously unreleased	6:22
6.	"Merry Christmas Mr. Lawrence"	Merry Christmas, Mr. Lawrence (soundtrack), 1983	4:46
7.	"M.A.Y. in The Backyard"	Ongaku Zukan / Illustrated Musical Encyclopedia, 1984	3:29
8.	"The Sheltering Sky"	The Sheltering Sky (soundtrack), 1990	4:33
9.	"A Tribute to N.J.P."	Ongaku Zukan, 1984	3:17
10.	"High Heels (Main Theme)"	High Heels (soundtrack), 1991	3:18
11.	"Aoneko no Torso" (青猫のトルソ, Torso of a Blue Cat)	Smoochy, 1995	2:32
12.	"The Wuthering Heights"	Emily Brontë's Wuthering Heights (soundtrack), 1992	5:20
13.	"Parolibre"	Futurista, 1986	3:22
14.	"Acceptance (End Credit) -Little Buddha-"	Little Buddha (soundtrack), 1994	7:30
15.	"Before Long"	Neo Geo, 1987	3:02
16.	"Bring them home"	Smoochy, 1995	3:24

The CD releases on the Milan label in the U.S. and Brazil have only tracks 1–12. The Milan CD release in the UK has only tracks 1–15.

== Live concert ==
Ryuichi Sakamoto Trio World Tour 1996
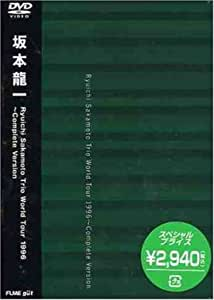
- Japanese DVD cover

Live album by Ryuichi Sakamoto
- Released: August 19, 1996 to September 1, 1996
- Genre: Chamber music
- Length: 1:54:04
- Labels: Güt, For Life
- Producer: Ryuichi Sakamoto

A concert, called Ryuichi Sakamoto Trio World Tour, was organized in 1996. The setlist of this concert is different than the original album. This concert was played at 6 venues in Japan, and the Bunkamura Orchard Hall concert was live streamed on August 28, 1996, on the Internet, and was one of the first concerts to be streamed. This concert was released on both DVD and Laserdisc.

No.	Title	Length
1.	"Bibo no Aozora"
2.	"Rain"
3.	"Merry Christmas, Mr. Lawrance"
4.	"The Sheltering Sky"
5.	"Aoneko no Torso"
6.	"Tango"
7.	"Improvisation (High Heels (Main Theme))"
8.	"Little Buddha"
9.	"The Wuthering Heights"
10.	"Asadoya Yunta"
11.	"M.A.Y. In The Backyard"
12.	"Thousand Knives"
13.	"1919"
14.	"A Flower Is Not A Flower"
15.	"The Last Emperor"
16.	"Tong Poo"
17.	"Parolibre"
18.	"Tango (Strings Version)"

== Personnel ==
Performers

- Ryuichi Sakamoto – piano
- Jaques Morelenbaum – cello
- Everton Nelson – violin (tracks 1, 3 – 7, 9 – 12 & 14)
- David Nadien – violin (tracks 2 & 8)
- Barry Finclair – violin (tracks 13 & 15)

Technical

- Fernando Aponte – engineer, mixing
- Ted Jensen – mastering
- Joe Lizzi & Jason Goldstein – assistant engineers
- Hideki Nakajima – art direction, design
- Yoshinori Ochiai – design
- Kazunari Tajima – photography
- Clare de Graw & David Rubinson – production managers

== Charts ==
2023 chart performance for 1996
Chart (2023)	Peak position
Japanese Hot Albums (Billboard Japan)	86

Chart performance for 1996 (30th anniversary edition)
Chart (2026)	Peak position
Japanese Albums (Oricon)	20
Japanese Combined Albums (Oricon)	42
