= Neo Geo (disambiguation) =

Neo Geo is a video game arcade and console system created by SNK Corporation.

Neo Geo may also refer to:

== Video gaming ==
- A hardware brand by SNK Corporation, including:
  - Neo Geo CD
  - Neo Geo X
  - Hyper Neo Geo 64
  - Neo Geo Pocket

== Music ==
- Neo Geo (album), a studio album by Ryuichi Sakamoto

== Art ==
- Neogeo (art)
- Neo-minimalism, an art movement also known as Neo-Geo or Neo-Geometric

== See also ==
- Variable Geo Neo, a Japanese 2D fighting game/eroge and OVA
