= 1996 (disambiguation) =

1996 was a leap year starting on Monday of the Gregorian calendar.

1996 may also refer to:

- 1996 (number)
- 1996 (Merle Haggard album)
- 1996 (Royal Hunt album)
- 1996 (Ryuichi Sakamoto album)
- 1996 (Eighteen Visions album)
- "1996" (song), a song by The Wombats
- 1996: la révélation, 1987 book by Jean Miguères
- "1996", a song by Ella Henderson from Chapter One
- "1996", a song by Marilyn Manson from Antichrist Superstar
- "1996", a song by Brand New from Leaked Demos 2006
- "1996", a song by Pomme from Les Failles
