= Esperanto (disambiguation) =

Esperanto is an international auxiliary language.

Esperanto may also refer to:

== Magazines ==
- Esperanto (magazine)
- Esperanto (student magazine), the student magazine of Monash University's Caulfield campus

== Music ==
- Esperanto (Elektric Music album), an album by Karl Bartos under the pseudonym Elektric Music
- Esperanto (Ryuichi Sakamoto album)
- Esperanto (Shadowfax album)
- Esperanto (Freundeskreis album)
- "Esperanto", a 1992 song by Shawn Lane from the album Powers of Ten
- Esperanto, a 1998 album by Kabah

== Other ==
- 1421 Esperanto, a main-belt asteroid
- Esperanto Island
- Esperanto Filmoj, a Mexican-American film and television production company
- Esperanto (schooner), a 1906 fishing schooner
