= Miu Sakamoto =

Japanese pop singer (born 1980)

- 坂本 美雨
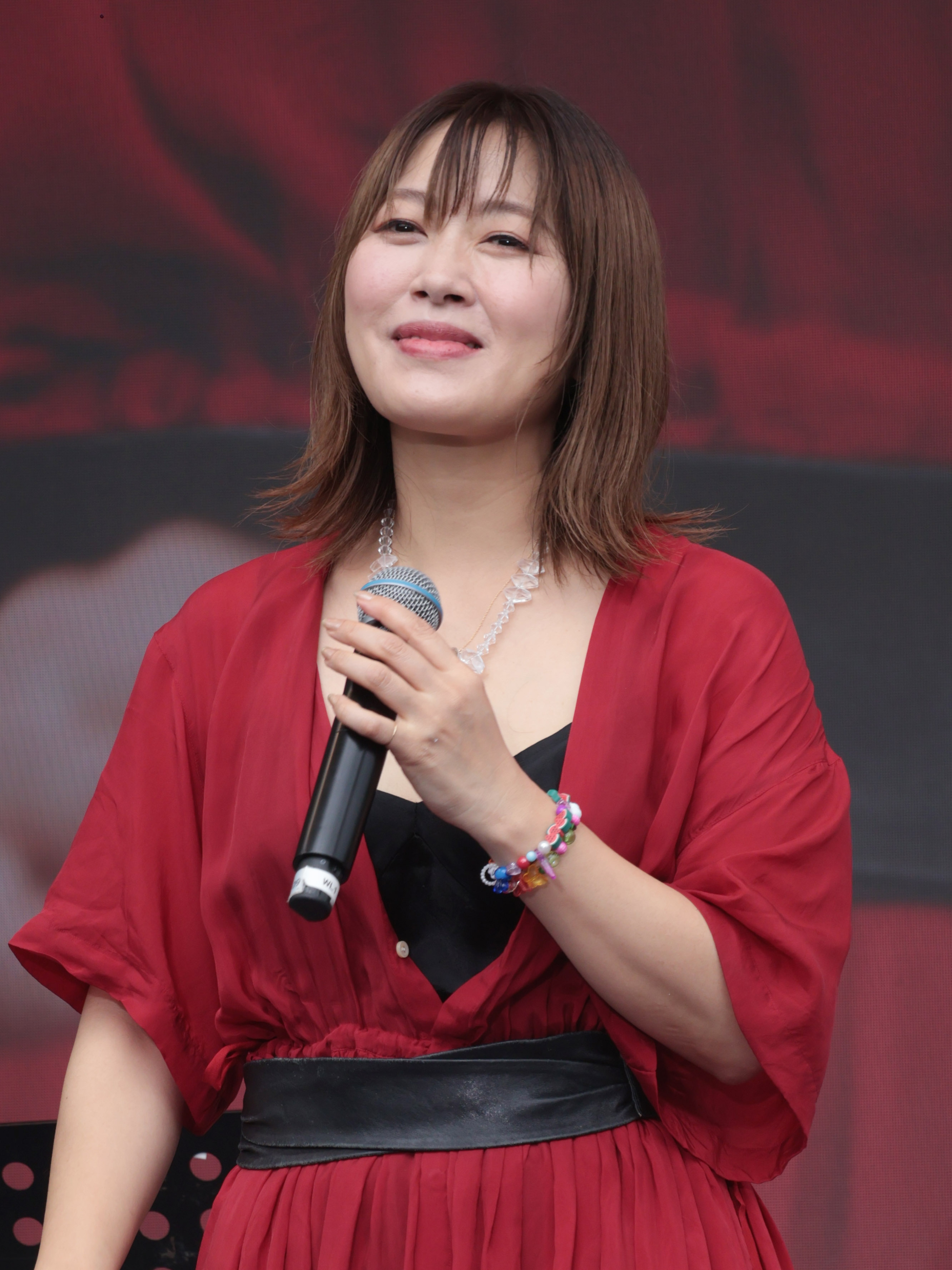
- Sakamoto in 2024
- Born: May 1, 1980 (age 46); Tokyo, Japan
- Other name: Sister M
- Occupation: Singer
- Years active: 1997–present
- Height: 160 cm (5 ft 3 in)
- Children: 1
- Parents: Ryuichi Sakamoto (father); Akiko Yano (mother)
- Musical career
- Genres: Pop; electropop; electronica; orchestral pop
- Instrument: Vocals
- Label: Warner Music Japan
- Website: www.miuskmt.com

Miu Sakamoto (坂本 美雨, Sakamoto Miu; born May 1, 1980) is a Japanese pop singer, writer, and actress. She is the daughter of musicians Ryuichi Sakamoto and Akiko Yano.

== Biography ==
Miu Sakamoto was born to musician parents, Ryuichi Sakamoto and Akiko Yano, in 1980. She grew up listening to her father's band, Yellow Magic Orchestra, as well as Kraftwerk. She has three half-siblings- her brother Fuuta, along with an older sister and a younger brother from her father's other marriages. Her grandfather Kazuki Sakamoto was an editor. In 1990, when Sakamoto was 9 years old, her family emigrated to New York, where she lived until she graduated from high school. As a result of her time in the U.S., she became bilingual in Japanese and English. Her name, "Miu", comes from the English word "mutant", given to her by her father.

Prior to her father's death, she would frequently travel between Japan and New York City, to visit her mother in Manhattan.

Sakamoto provided a cover of "Miu" for the January 29, 2020 Buck-Tick tribute album Parade III ~Respective Tracks of Buck-Tick.

== Discography ==
=== Albums ===
- DAWN PINK (September 29, 1999)
- Harmonious (May 24, 2006)
- Oboro no Kanata, Akari no Kehai (December 12, 2007) – (Produced by SUGIZO)
- Zoy (November 5, 2008)
- PHANTOM Girl (May 19, 2010) (Produced by The Shanghai Restoration Project)
- HATSUKOI (May 18, 2011) (SRP)
- I'm yours! (August 8, 2012) (SRP)
- Waving Flags (March 5, 2014)
- Sing with me II (with Cantus) (December 7, 2016)

=== Mini-Albums ===
- aquascape (November 26, 1998)
- sorato (Masakatsu Takagi x Sakamoto Miu) (October 10, 2007)
- iTunes Live from Tokyo (January 23, 2008)
- Sing with me (with Cantus) (June 22, 2016)

=== Compilations ===
- miusic ~The best of 1997–2012~ (June 26, 2013)

=== Live albums ===
- LIVE Waving Flags (March 18, 2015)

=== Singles ===
- "Poppoya" (May 26, 1999) – composed and arranged by Ryuichi Sakamoto, with lyrics by Tamio Okuda
- "in aquascape" (September 8, 1999) – written by Miu Sakamoto, composed and arranged by Ryuichi Sakamoto
- "I'll believe the look in your eyes" (February 9, 2000) – written by Miu Sakamoto, composed by Yuka Kawamura, and arranged by Ryuichi Sakamoto
- "beautiful" (July 26, 2000) – written by Miu Sakamoto, composed and arranged by Yuka Honda
- "Blank" (April 11, 2001) – written by Miu Sakamoto, composed and arranged by Toru Okada
- "15fun" (May 23, 2001) – written by Miu Sakamoto, composed and arranged by Noriyuki Makihara
- "Kaze Hikaru" (October 24, 2001) – written by Miu Sakamoto, composed and arranged by Kenji Kawai
- "sleep away" (April 24, 2002) – written by Miu Sakamoto, composed and arranged by SUGIZO
- "Kumanbachi ga tonde kita" (November 20, 2002) – written by Shigesato Itoi and composed by Akiko Yano
- "The NeverEnding Story" (November 16, 2005) – composed by Giorgio Moroder, with lyrics by Keith Forsey

=== Digital Singles ===
- [2005.09.12] Never Ending Story (CM Version)
- [2010.04.14] Phantom Girl's First Love
- [2010.05.19] Phantom Girl's First Love -Classical Remix-
- [2010.11.24] Hajimari Hajimari (はじまりはじまり; Beginning Beginning)
- [2011.05.18] Precious
- [2012.07.04] Anata to Watashi no Aida ni Aru Mono Subete Ai to Yobu (あなたと私の間にあるもの全て愛と呼ぶ)
- [2012.09.12] I'm yours (Taan Newjam Remix)

== Participation in Vocaloid ==
Miu Sakamoto is the voice provider for Yamaha's Vocaloid Mew. Mew was a starter Vocaloid released alongside the Vocaloid 3 software, with VY1V3.

Mew's first single, "Line", debuted in The Vocaloid, an album produced by Yamaha.
