= Yanokami =

Japanese music duo

- Akiko Yano (left) and Rei Harakami (right)

Background information
- Origin: Japan
- Genres: Pop; electronica
- Years active: 2007–2011
- Label: Yamaha Music
- Past members: Akiko Yano; Rei Harakami
- Website: www.yanokami.com

Yanokami (stylized as yanokami) was a Japanese music duo consisting of Akiko Yano and Rei Harakami.

== History ==
Yanokami was formed by Akiko Yano and Rei Harakami in 2003.

The duo's debut studio album, Yanokami, was released on 8 August 2007. It peaked at number 24 on the Oricon Albums Chart. An English-language version of the album, titled Yanokamick, was released on 12 March 2008. It peaked at number 234 on the Oricon Albums Chart.

On 14 December 2011, the duo posthumously (as Harakami had died 5 months prior) released a studio album, titled Tōku wa Chikai, and its instrumental version, titled Tōku wa Chikai: Reprise. They peaked at number 58 and 134, respectively, on the Oricon Albums Chart.

== Discography ==
=== Studio albums ===
- Yanokami (2007)
- Yanokamick (2008)
- Tōku wa Chikai (2011)
- Tōku wa Chikai: Reprise (2011)

=== EPs ===
- Yanokami EP (2007)
- iTunes Live from Tokyo (2007)

=== Singles ===
- "Bamboo Music" (2011)
