= Ryuichi Sakamoto =

Japanese composer (1952–2023)

- 坂本 龍一
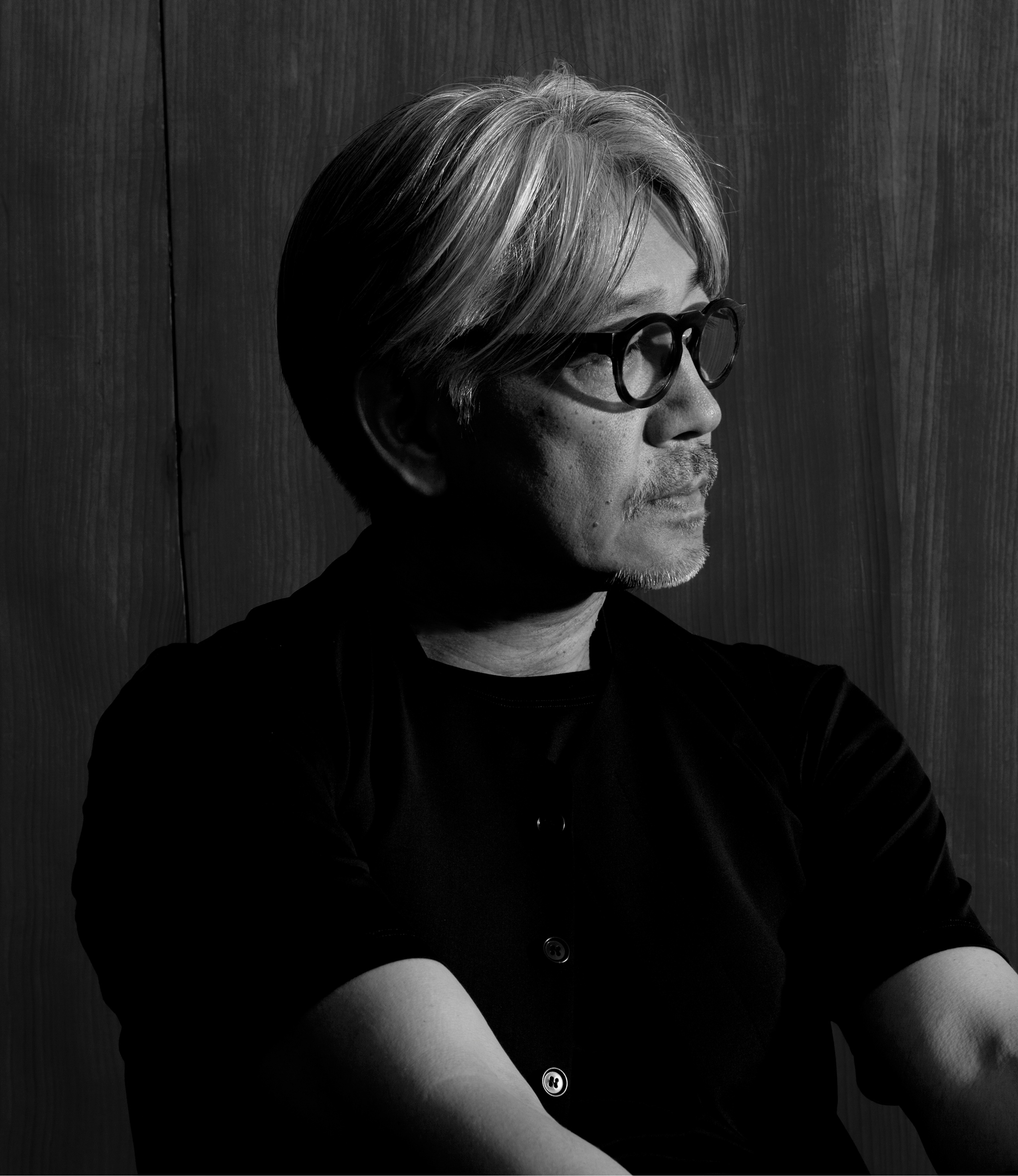
- Sakamoto in 2013
- Born: January 17, 1952; Nakano, Tokyo, Japan
- Died: March 28, 2023 (aged 71); Tokyo, Japan
- Education: Tokyo National University of Fine Arts and Music (BA, MA)
- Occupations: Musician; record producer; actor
- Years active: 1975–2023
- Spouses: Natsuko Sakamoto (m. 1972; div. 1982); Akiko Yano (m. 1982; div. 2006)
- Children: 3, including Miu Sakamoto and Neo Sora
- Musical career
- Genres: Classical; Electronic; ambient; avant-garde; electro; electro-pop; experimental; film score; glitch; minimal; synth-pop; techno; world
- Instruments: Keyboards; vocoder; marimba; sampler; vocals
- Works: Ryuichi Sakamoto discography
- Labels: Columbia; Alfa; MIDI; Sony Japan; EMI; For Life; Warner; commmons; A&M; Restless
- Formerly of: Yellow Magic Orchestra; Sketch Show
- Website: sitesakamoto.com

Ryuichi Sakamoto (Note: Occasionally romanized as Riuichi Sakamoto) (Japanese: 坂本 龍一 (Note: Japanese pronunciation: [sa̠ka̠mo̞to̞ ɾʲɨːit͡ɕi]), Hepburn: Sakamoto Ryūichi; January 17, 1952 – March 28, 2023) was a Japanese musician, composer, keyboardist, record producer, singer and actor. He pursued a diverse range of styles as a solo artist and as a member of the synth-based band Yellow Magic Orchestra (YMO). With his YMO bandmates Haruomi Hosono and Yukihiro Takahashi, Sakamoto influenced and pioneered a number of electronic music genres. As a film score composer, Sakamoto won an Academy Award (Oscar), BAFTA, Grammy and two Golden Globe Awards.

Sakamoto began his career as a session musician, producer, and arranger while he was at the Tokyo National University of Fine Arts and Music in the mid 1970s. His first major success came in 1978 as co-founder of YMO. He pursued a solo career at the same time, releasing the experimental electronic fusion album Thousand Knives in that year, and the album B-2 Unit in 1980. B-2 Unit includes the track "Riot in Lagos", which had a significant influence on the development of electro, hip-hop and dance music. He went on to produce more solo records, and collaborate with many international artists, including David Sylvian, DJ Spooky, Carsten Nicolai, Youssou N'Dour, and Fennesz. Sakamoto composed music for the opening ceremony of the 1992 Barcelona Summer Olympic Games, and his composition "Energy Flow" (1999) was the first instrumental number-one single in Japan's Oricon charts history.

Merry Christmas, Mr. Lawrence (1983) marked his debut as both an actor and a film score composer; its main theme was adapted into the single "Forbidden Colours", which became an international hit. His most successful work as a film composer was his original score for The Last Emperor (1987), for which he won the Academy Award for Best Original Score, making him the first Japanese composer to win an Academy Award. He continued earning accolades composing for films such as The Sheltering Sky (1990), Little Buddha (1993), and The Revenant (2015). On occasion, Sakamoto also worked as a composer and a scenario writer on anime and video games. He was awarded the Ordre des Arts et des Lettres from the French Ministry of Culture in 2009 for his contributions to music. Sakamoto died on March 28, 2023, from colorectal cancer at the age of 71.

== Early life ==
Ryuichi Sakamoto was born on January 17, 1952, in Tokyo. His father, Kazuki Sakamoto, was a well-known literary editor, and his mother, Keiko (Shimomura) Sakamoto, designed women's hats. He began taking piano lessons at age 6, and started to compose at age 10. His early influences included Johann Sebastian Bach and Claude Debussy — whom he once called "the door to all 20th century music." He also said, "Asian music" (Javanese Gamelan) "heavily influenced Debussy, and Debussy heavily influenced me. So, the music goes around the world and comes full circle."

He discovered jazz and rock and roll as a teenager, when he fell in with a crowd of hipster rebels. He was also influenced by jazz musicians such as John Coltrane and Ornette Coleman, and by rock bands such as The Beatles and The Rolling Stones. He described his political leanings during his time as a student as "not a 100 percent Marxist, but kind of". At the height of the Japanese student protest movement, he and Yasuhisa Shiozaki along with dozens of other classmates barricaded themselves in their high school principals's office, seeking changes to the way the school was run.

Sakamoto entered the Tokyo National University of Fine Arts and Music in 1970, earning a B.A. in music composition in 1974 and a M.A. in 1976, with special emphasis on both electronic and ethnic music. He studied ethnomusicology there with the intention of becoming a researcher in the field, due to his interest in various world music traditions, particularly the Japanese, Okinawan, Indian, Indonesian and African musical traditions. He was also trained in classical music and began experimenting with the electronic music equipment available at the university, including synthesizers such as the Buchla, Moog, and ARP.

== Solo career ==
=== 1970s ===
In 1975, Sakamoto collaborated with percussionist Tsuchitori Toshiyuki to release Disappointment-Hateruma. In 1977, Sakamoto began working as a session musician with Haruomi Hosono and Yukihiro Takahashi. Together, the trio formed the electronic band Yellow Magic Orchestra (YMO) in 1978.

In mid-1978, Sakamoto released his first solo album Thousand Knives of Ryūichi Sakamoto, with the help of Hideki Matsutake—Hosono also contributed to the song "Thousand Knives". The album experimented with different styles, such as "Thousand Knives" and "The End of Asia"—in which electronic music was fused with traditional Japanese music—while "Grasshoppers" is a more minimalistic piano song. The album was recorded from April to July 1978 with a variety of electronic musical instruments, including various synthesizers, such as the KORG PS-3100, a polyphonic synthesizer; the Oberheim Eight Voice; the Moog III-C; the Polymoog, the Minimoog; the Micromoog; the Korg VC-10, which is a vocoder; the KORG SQ-10, which is an analog sequencer; the Syn-Drums, an electronic drum kit; and the microprocessor-based Roland MC-8 Microcomposer, which is a music sequencer that was programmed by Matsutake and played by Sakamoto.

=== 1980s ===
In 1980, Sakamoto released his second solo album, B-2 Unit, which has been referred to as his "edgiest" record and is known for the electronic track "Riot in Lagos", which is considered an early example of electro music (electro-funk), as Sakamoto anticipated the beats and sounds of electro. Early electro and hip-hop artists, such as Afrika Bambaataa and Kurtis Mantronik, were influenced by the album—especially "Riot in Lagos"—with Mantronik citing the work as a major influence on his electro hip-hop group Mantronix. "Riot in Lagos" was later included in Playgroup's compilation album Kings of Electro (2007), alongside other significant electro compositions, such as Hashim's "Al-Naafyish" (1983). The album is also credited with introducing the influential Roland TR-808 drum machine "in the clubs for the first time" with "a new body music" that "foretold the future" of music according to Mary Anne Hobbs of BBC Radio 6 Music.

According to Dusted Magazine, Sakamoto's use of squelching bounce sounds and mechanical beats was later incorporated in early electro and hip-hop productions, such as "Message II (Survival)" by Melle Mel and Duke Bootee (1982), "Magic's Wand" (1982) by Whodini and Thomas Dolby, "Electric Kingdom" (1983) by Twilight 22, and The Album (1985) by Mantronix. The 1980 release of "Riot in Lagos" was listed by The Guardian in 2011 as one of the 50 key important events in the history of dance music, at number six on its list. Resident Advisor said the track anticipated the sounds of techno and hip-hop music, and that it inspired numerous artists from cities such as Tokyo, New York City and Detroit. Peter Tasker of Nikkei Asia said it was influential on techno, hip-hop and house music.

One of the tracks on B-2 Unit, "Differencia" has, according to Fact, "relentless tumbling beats and a stabbing bass synth that foreshadows jungle by nearly a decade". Some tracks on the album also foreshadow genres such as IDM, broken beat, and industrial techno, and the work of producers such as Actress and Oneohtrix Point Never. For several tracks on the album, Sakamoto worked with UK reggae producer Dennis Bovell, incorporating elements of Afrobeat and dub music. According to Pitchfork, "B-2 Unit still sounds futuristic" with tracks such as "E-3A" looking "ahead to Mouse on Mars’ idyllic ’90s electronica."

Also in 1980, Sakamoto released the single "War Head/Lexington Queen", an experimental synthpop and electro record. His collaboration with Kiyoshiro Imawano, "Ikenai Rouge Magic", also topped the Oricon singles chart. Sakamoto also began a long-standing collaboration with David Sylvian, when he co-wrote and performed on the Japan track "Taking Islands in Africa" in 1980.

In 1981, Sakamoto collaborated with Talking Heads and King Crimson guitarist Adrian Belew and Robin Scott for an album titled Left-Handed Dream. According to The Baffler, the album combined "slow, simmering, primeval" techno with "sprawling, raw-edged sci-fi gagaku" using traditional Japanese taiko drums.

Sakamoto worked on another collaboration with Sylvian, a single entitled "Bamboo Houses/Bamboo Music" in 1982. The song "Bamboo Houses" in particular "accidentally predicted" grime music according to Fact magazine, calling it "the earliest example of proto-grime" with similarities to the Sinogrime subgenre which Wiley and Jammer were known for in the 2000s. Sakamoto's earlier 1978 songs "Grasshoppers" and "The End of Asia" from Thousand Knives also have melodic lines similar to grime or Sinogrime.

Sakamoto began work on his next album Ongaku Zukan in 1982, but it didn't release until 1984. During production, he was one of the first musicians to use the Yamaha DX7, the same year the digital synthesizer released in 1983. He initially used the DX7 for Mari Iijima's debut city pop album Rosé, released in 1983, before using it for his solo album Ongaku Zukan, which eventually released in 1984.

Sakamoto broadened his musical range with a number of solo albums such Ongaku Zukan (1984), Neo Geo (1987), and Beauty (1989). These albums included collaborations with artists such as Thomas Dolby, Iggy Pop, Youssou N'Dour, and Brian Wilson.

In 1985, Sakamoto was commissioned to score a dance composition by New York choreographer Molissa Fenley called Esperanto. The performance itself debuted at the Joyce Theater, to mixed reviews from Anna Kisselgoff at The New York Times which said of Sakamoto's music, that "The sound often resembles a radio shut on and off." The score was subsequently released in Japan by Midi, Inc., and includes contributions from Arto Lindsay and YAS-KAZ. Jen Monroe of The Baffler said the sample-based music "manages to be unremittingly gorgeous, aggressive, angular, and lush."

=== 1990s ===
Heartbeat (1991) and Sweet Revenge (1994) feature Sakamoto's collaborations with a global range of artists such as Roddy Frame, Dee Dee Brave, Marco Prince, Arto Lindsay, Youssou N'Dour, David Sylvian, and Ingrid Chavez. In 1992, Sakamoto composed music for the opening ceremony of the 1992 Summer Olympics in Barcelona, Spain.

In 1995, Sakamoto released Smoochy, described by the Sound on Sound website as Sakamoto's "excursion into the land of easy-listening and Latin", followed by the 1996 album, which featured a number of previously released pieces arranged for solo piano, violin, and cello. During December 1996 Sakamoto, composed the entirety of an hour-long orchestral work entitled "Untitled 01" and released as the album Discord (1998). The Sony Classical release of Discord was sold in a jewel case that was covered by a blue-colored slipcase made of foil, while the CD also contained a data video track. In 1998 the Ninja Tune record label released the Prayer/Salvation Remixes, for which prominent electronica artists such as Ashley Beedle and Andrea Parker remixed sections from the "Prayer" and "Salvation" parts of Discord. Sakamoto collaborated primarily with guitarist David Torn and DJ Spooky—artist Laurie Anderson provides spoken word on the composition—and the recording was condensed from nine live performances of the work, recorded during a Japanese tour. Discord was divided into four parts: "Grief", "Anger", "Prayer", and "Salvation"; Sakamoto explained in 1998 that he was "not religious, but maybe spiritual" and "The Prayer is to anybody or anything you want to name." Sakamoto further explained:

The themes of Prayer and Salvation came out of the feelings of sadness and frustration that I expressed in the first two movements, about the fact that people are starving in the world, and we are not able to help them. People are dying, and yet the political and economical and historical situations are too complicated and inert for us to do much about it. So I got really angry with myself. I asked myself what I could do, and since there's not a lot I can do on the practical level, all that's left for me is to pray. But it's not enough just to pray; I also had to think about actually saving those people, so the last movement is called Salvation. That's the journey of the piece.

In 1998, Italian ethnomusicologist Massimo Milano published Ryuichi Sakamoto. Conversazioni through the Padova, Arcana imprint. All three editions of the book were published in the Italian language. Sakamoto's next album, BTTB (1999)—an acronym for "Back to the Basics" is comprised a series of original pieces on solo piano influenced by Debussy and Satie and includes "Energy Flow" (a major hit in Japan) and an arrangement of the Yellow Magic Orchestra classic "Tong Poo".

Sakamoto's long-awaited "opera" LIFE was released in 1999, with visual direction by Shiro Takatani, artistic director of Dumb Type. This ambitious multi-genre multi-media project featured contributions from Pina Bausch, Bernardo Bertolucci, Josep Carreras, Salif Keita, the Dalai Lama, and Salman Rushdie. In 2007, they "deconstructed" all the visual images and the sound, to create an art installation.

=== 2000s ===
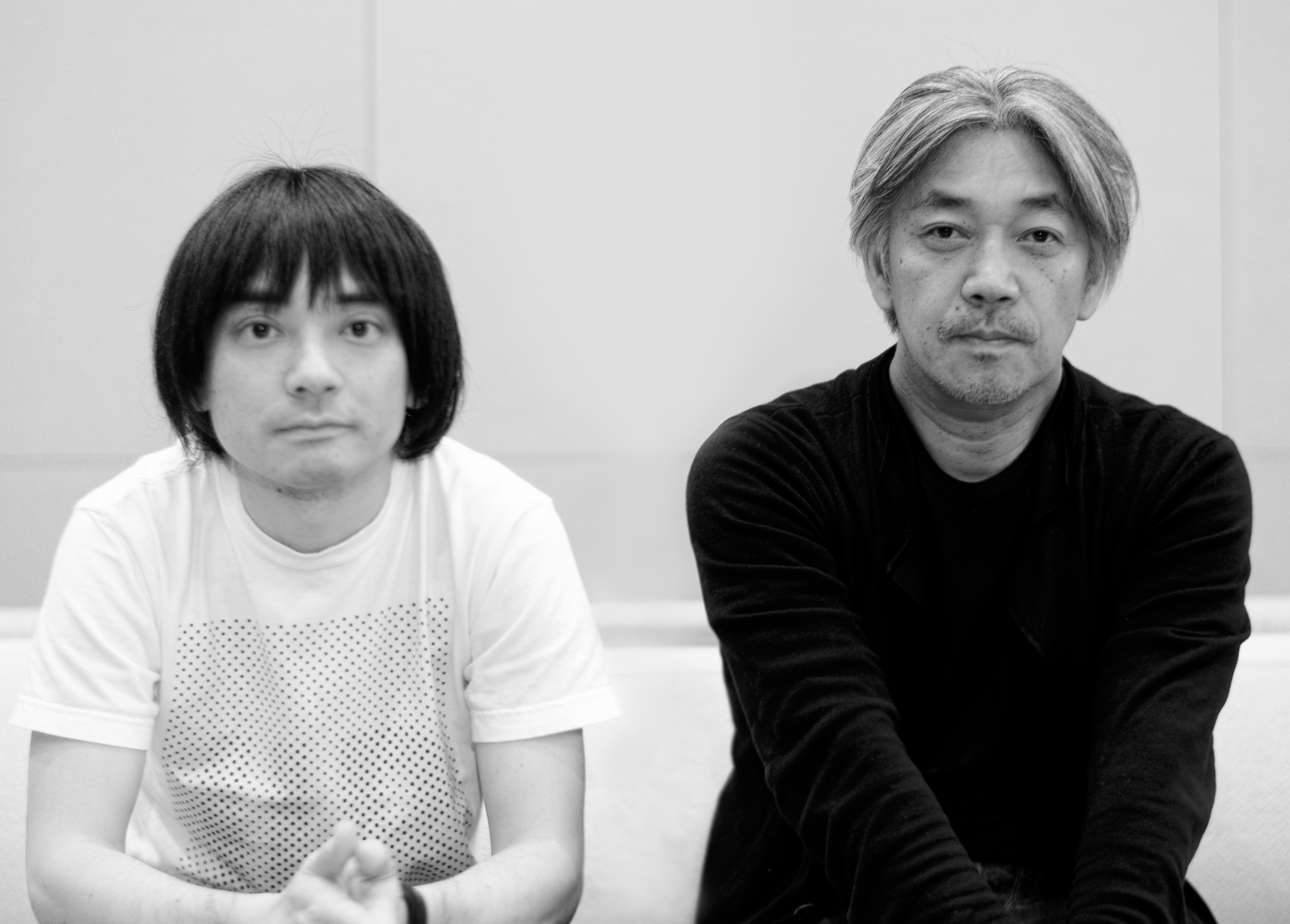
Keigo Oyamada with Sakamoto in 2007

In the early 2000s, Sakamoto did extensive work in experimental ambient and glitch music. His works in these genres at the time include collaborations with Fennesz.

Sakamoto teamed with cellist Jaques Morelenbaum and singer Paula Morelenbaum, on a pair of albums celebrating the work of bossa nova pioneer Antonio Carlos Jobim. They recorded their first album, Casa (2001), mostly in Jobim's home studio in Rio de Janeiro, with Sakamoto performing on the late Jobim's grand piano. The album was well received, having been included in the list of The New York Times's top albums of 2002. A live album, Live in Tokyo, and a second album, A Day in New York, soon followed. Sakamoto and the Morelenbaums would also collaborate on N.M.L. No More Landmine, an international effort to raise awareness for the removal of landmines. The trio would release the single "Zero Landmine", which also featured David Sylvian, Brian Eno, Kraftwerk, Cyndi Lauper, and Haruomi Hosono and Yukihiro Takahashi, the other two founding members of Yellow Magic Orchestra.

Sakamoto collaborated with Alva Noto (an alias of Carsten Nicolai) to release Vrioon, an album of Sakamoto's piano clusters treated by Nicolai's unique style of digital manipulation, involving the creation of "micro-loops" and minimal percussion. The two produced this work by passing the pieces back and forth until both were satisfied with the result. This debut, released on German label Raster-Noton, was voted record of the year 2004 in the electronica category by British magazine The Wire. They then released Insen (2005)—while produced in a similar manner to Vrioon, this album is somewhat more restrained and minimalist. After further collaboration, they released two more albums: utp_ (2008) and Summvs (2011).

In 2005, Finnish mobile phone manufacturer Nokia hired Sakamoto to compose ring and alert tones for their high-end phone, the Nokia 8800. In 2006, Nokia offered the ringtones for free on their website. Around this time, a reunion with YMO cofounders Hosono and Takahashi caused a stir in the Japanese press. They released a single "Rescue" in 2007 and a DVD "HAS/YMO" in 2008. In July 2009, Sakamoto was honored as Officier of Ordre des Arts et des Lettres at the French embassy in Tokyo.

=== 2010s ===
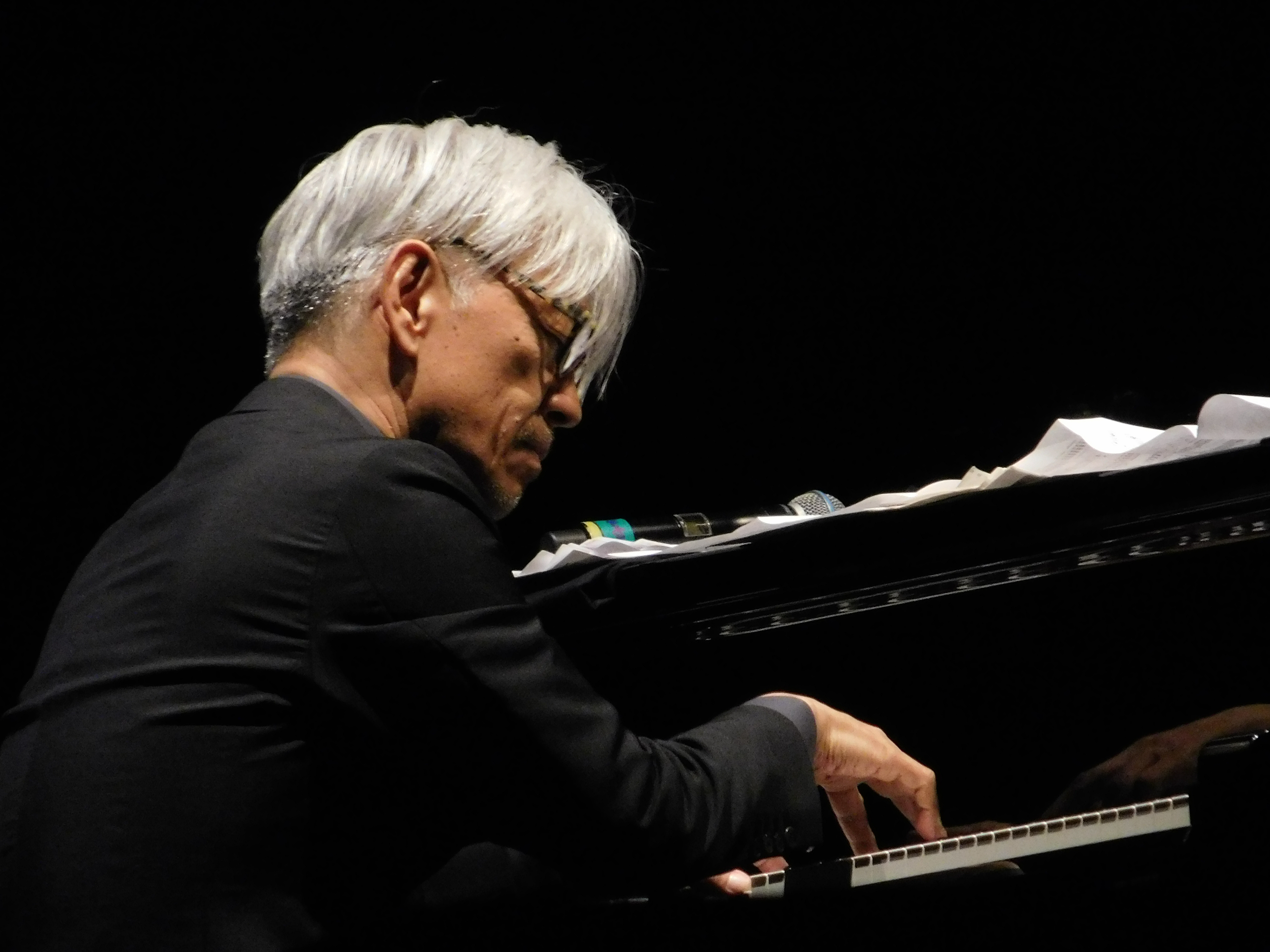
Sakamoto performing in São Paulo, 2017

Throughout the latter part of the 2000s, Sakamoto collaborated on several projects with visual artist Shiro Takatani, including the installations LIFE – fluid, invisible, inaudible... (2007–2013), commissioned by YCAM, Yamaguchi, collapsed and silence spins at the Museum of Contemporary Art Tokyo in 2012 and 2013 Sharjah Biennial (U.A.E.), LIFE-WELL in 2013, and a special version for Park Hyatt Tokyo's 20th anniversary in 2014, and he did music for the joint performance LIFE-WELL featuring the actor Noh/Kyogen Mansai Nomura, and for Shiro Takatani's performance ST/LL in 2015.

In 2013, Sakamoto was a jury member at the 70th Venice International Film Festival. The jury viewed 20 films and was chaired by filmmaker Bernardo Bertolucci.

On April 14, 2013, he also participated in a performance of film and music by video pioneer Nam June Paik, selected by musicians and composers who knew him well: himself, Stephen Vitiello, and Steina Vasulka.

In 2014, Sakamoto became the first guest artistic director of the Sapporo International Art Festival 2014 (SIAF2014). On July 10, Sakamoto released a statement indicating that he had been diagnosed with oropharyngeal cancer in late June of the same year. He announced a break from his work while he sought treatment and recovery. On August 3, 2015, Sakamoto posted on his website that he was "in great shape ... I am thinking about returning to work" and announced that he would be providing music for Yoji Yamada's Haha to Kuraseba (Living with My Mother). In 2015, Sakamoto also composed the score for the Alejandro González Iñárritu's film, The Revenant, for which he received a Golden Globe nomination.

In January 2017 it was announced that Sakamoto would release a solo album in April 2017 through Milan Records; the new album, titled async, was released on March 29, 2017, to critical acclaim. In February 2018, he was selected to be on the jury for the main competition section of the 68th Berlin International Film Festival.

On June 14, 2018, a documentary about the life and work of Sakamoto, entitled Ryuichi Sakamoto: Coda, was released. The film follows Sakamoto as he recovers from cancer and resumes creating music, protests nuclear power plants following the Fukushima Daiichi nuclear disaster, and creates field recordings in a variety of locales. He also elucidates the influence of Russian director Andrei Tarkovsky on the making of his then upcoming album async. Sakamoto says, "When I started making the album, the sound that was in my mind was the Bach theme from Solaris, arranged on synthesizers by Eduard Artemyev. I arranged the same piece in the beginning of the process for async, and it sounded really good. It was very different from Artemyev's version, so I was very happy. Then I arranged four more Bach chorales next to that, and they all sounded really good. So I thought, maybe this is the album? Then I thought I needed to do something more, to write my own chorale. I tried, and that became the song "solari", obviously, with no "s". Directed by Stephen Nomura Schible, the documentary was met with critical praise.

He later said, "As I've been making music and trying to go deeper and deeper, I was finally able to understand what the Tarkovsky movies are about – how symphonic they are – it's almost music. Not just the sounds – it's a symphony of moving images and sounds. They are more complex than music." He calls Tarkovsky and French director Robert Bresson his favorites, claiming their books – Notes on the Cinematographer and Sculpting in Time, respectively – as "[his] bible."

=== 2020s ===
In 2021 he was associate artist of Holland Festival in Amsterdam where he presented the world premiere of TIME, his last collaboration with his long-term collaborator Shiro Takatani. This "wordless opera", featuring dancer and actor Min Tanaka and shô player Mayumi Miyata was inspired by the first tale from Soseki Natsume's collection of short stories Ten Nights of Dreams.

In 2022 he took part in the creation of Dumb Type's new installation 2022 as a new member of the Japanese collective, for the Japanese pavilion at the 59th International Art Exhibition – La Biennale di Venezia.

The same year Sakamoto collaborated with the young Ukrainian violinist Illia Bondarenko on the single "Piece for Illia" as part of the compilation fundraiser Ukraine (volume 2) for relief for victims of the Russo-Ukrainian war.

On April 24, 2023, the song "Snooze" was released by Agust D (Suga of BTS), which was dedicated to Sakamoto, who featured in the song as a keyboardist. Sakamoto also appears in the music trailers leading up to the Agust D album, D-Day.

In 2023, filmmaker Neo Sora – Sakamoto's son – directed a final performance of Sakamoto playing solo piano, released as Ryuichi Sakamoto: Opus. It premiered at the Venice Film Festival in 2023.

== Yellow Magic Orchestra ==
After working as a session musician with Haruomi Hosono and Yukihiro Takahashi in 1977, the trio formed the internationally successful electronic band Yellow Magic Orchestra (YMO) in 1978. Known for their seminal influence on electronic music, the group helped pioneer electronic genres such as electropop/technopop, synthpop, cyberpunk music, ambient house, and electronica. The group's work has had a lasting influence across genres, ranging from hip-hop and techno to acid house and melodic music. Sakamoto was the songwriter and composer for a number of the band's hit songs—including "Yellow Magic (Tong Poo)" (1978), "Technopolis" (1979), "Nice Age" (1980), "Ongaku" (1983), and "You've Got to Help Yourself" (1983)—while playing keyboards for many of their other songs, including international hits such as "Computer Game/Firecracker" (1978) and "Rydeen" (1979). He also sang on several songs, such as "Kimi ni Mune Kyun" (1983). Sakamoto's composition "Technopolis" (1979) was credited as a contribution to the development of techno music.

Sakamoto's internationally successful composition "Behind the Mask" (1978)—a synthpop song in which he sang vocals through a vocoder—was later covered by a number of international artists, including Michael Jackson and Eric Clapton. "Behind the Mask" was one of the first songs to use a gated reverb effect on the snare drum, a technique that later became popular in 1980s pop music.

A version of Sakamoto's 1978 song "Thousand Knives" was released on Yellow Magic Orchestra's 1981 album BGM. This version was one of the earliest uses of the Roland TR-808 drum machine, for YMO's live performance of "1000 Knives" in 1980 and their BGM album release in 1981.

== Production career ==
Sakamoto's production credits represent a prolific career in this role. In 1977, he was the arranger and lead keyboardist for Taeko Ohnuki's city pop album Sunshower. In 1983, he produced Mari Iijima's debut city pop album Rosé, shortly before Yellow Magic Orchestra disbanded. This was the first album where Sakamoto used a Yamaha DX7, making him one of the digital synthesizer's first users in its year of release, before using it for his solo album Ongaku Zukan released the following year.

Sakamoto worked with artists such as Thomas Dolby; Aztec Camera, on the Dreamland (1993) album; and Imai Miki, co-producing her 1994 album A Place in the Sun. In 1996, Sakamoto produced "Mind Circus", the first single from actress Miki Nakatani, leading to a collaboration period spanning 9 singles and 7 albums though 2001.

Roddy Frame, who worked with Sakamoto as a member of Aztec Camera, explained in a 1993 interview preceding the release of Dreamland that he had had to wait a lengthy period of time before he was able to work with Sakamoto, who wrote two soundtracks, a solo album and music for the opening ceremony at the Barcelona Olympics, prior to working with Frame over four weeks in a New York studio. Frame said that he was impressed by the work of YMO and the Merry Christmas Mr Lawrence soundtrack, explaining: "That's where you realise that the atmosphere around his compositions is actually in the writing – it's got nothing to do with synthesisers." Frame's decision to ask Sakamoto was finalized after he saw his performance at the Japan Festival that was held in London, United Kingdom. Of his experience recording with Sakamoto, Frame said:

He's got this reputation as a boffin, a professor of music who sits in front of a computer screen. But he's more intuitive than that, and he's always trying to corrupt what he knows. Halfway through the day in the studio, he will stop and play some hip hop or some house for 10 minutes, and then go back to what he was doing. He's always trying to trip himself up like that, and to discover new things. Just before we worked together he'd been out in Borneo, I think, with a DAT machine, looking for new sounds.

In 1994, the Japan Football Association asked Ryuichi Sakamoto to compose the instrumental song "Japanese Soccer Anthem". The composition was played at the beginning of Japan Football Association-sponsored events.

Sakamoto also produced video game music. In 1989, he composed music for one of the first CD-ROM games, Far East of Eden: Ziria for the PC Engine. In 1998, he composed the startup sound for Sega's Dreamcast console. In the 2000s, he composed music for the Dreamcast game LOL: Lack of Love (2000) and the PlayStation 2 games Seven Samurai 20XX (2004) and Dawn of Mana (2006).

== Film career ==
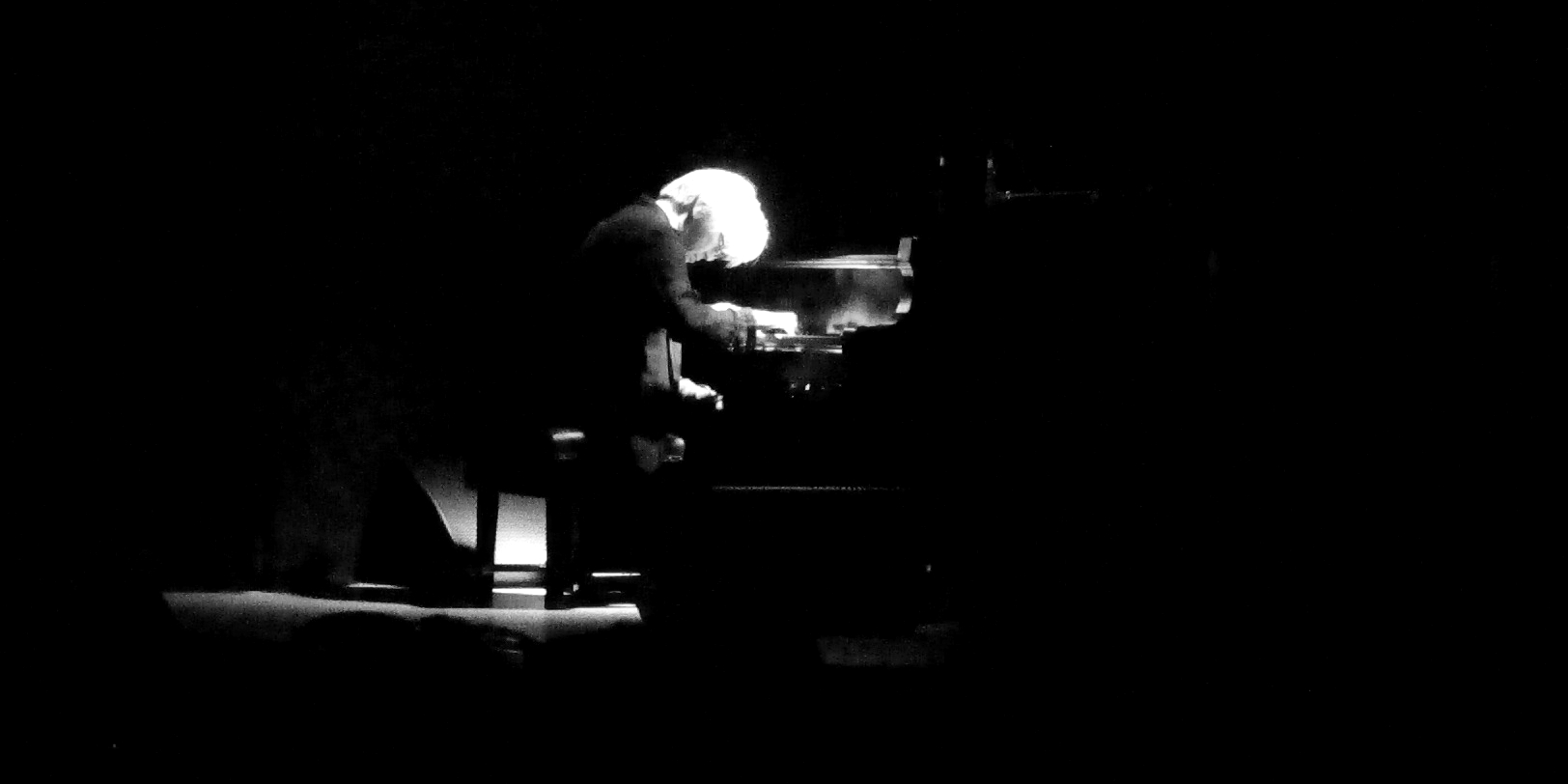
Sakamoto performing in Germany in 2011

Sakamoto began working in films, as a composer and actor, in Nagisa Oshima's Merry Christmas Mr. Lawrence (1983), where he starred alongside David Bowie. The score is best known for Sakamoto's "Merry Christmas Mr. Lawrence" instrumental theme. He collaborated with David Sylvian on a vocal version, "Forbidden Colours"–which became a chart hit in the UK. In a 2016 interview, Sakamoto reflected on his time acting in the film, saying he "hung out" with Bowie every evening for a month while filming on location. He remembered Bowie as "straightforward" and "nice" while lamenting that he never mustered the courage to ask for Bowie's help while scoring the film's soundtrack as he believed Bowie was too "concentrated" on acting.

He was the subject of Elizabeth Lennard's 1985 documentary Tokyo Melody, which mixes studio footage and interviews with Sakamoto about his musical philosophy in a nonlinear format, against a backdrop of 1980s Tokyo. Sakamoto later composed Bernardo Bertolucci's The Last Emperor (1987), which earned him an Academy Award and Grammy Award with fellow composers David Byrne and Cong Su. In that same year, Sakamoto composed the score to the cult-classic anime film Royal Space Force: The Wings of Honnêamise. He also composed the music for the original Japanese version of The Adventures of Chatran.

Other films scored by Sakamoto include Bertolucci's The Sheltering Sky (1990) and The Little Buddha (1993); Pedro Almodóvar's High Heels (1991); Oliver Stone's Wild Palms (1993); John Maybury's Love Is the Devil: Study for a Portrait of Francis Bacon (1998); Brian De Palma's Snake Eyes (1998) and Femme Fatale (2002); Oshima's Gohatto (1999); Jun Ichikawa's (director of the Mitsui ReHouse commercial from 1997 to 1999 starring Chizuru Ikewaki and Mao Inoue) Tony Takitani (2005);, Hwang Dong-hyuk's, The Fortress (2017); and Andrew Levitas's Minamata (2020) starring Johnny Depp, Minami, and Bill Nighy.

Several tracks from Sakamoto's earlier solo albums have also appeared in film soundtracks. In particular, variations of "Chinsagu No Hana" (from Beauty) and "Bibo No Aozora" (from 1996) provide the poignant closing pieces for Sue Brooks's Japanese Story (2003) and Alejandro González Iñárritu's Babel (2006), respectively. In 2015, Sakamoto teamed up with Iñárritu to score his film, The Revenant, starring Leonardo DiCaprio and Tom Hardy. The film Monster by director Hirokazu Kore-eda, released in 2023, was Sakamoto's final score; the film is dedicated to his memory. According to Resident Advisor, Sakamoto's classical compositions were influential in helping to define modern classical music.

Sakamoto also acted in several films: perhaps his most notable performance was as the conflicted Captain Yonoi in Merry Christmas Mr Lawrence, alongside Takeshi Kitano and British rock singer David Bowie. He also played roles in The Last Emperor (as Masahiko Amakasu) and Madonna's "Rain" music video.

== Personal life ==
In 1972, Sakamoto married Natsuko Sakamoto, with whom he had a daughter. The couple divorced in 1982, when Sakamoto married Japanese pianist and singer Akiko Yano, following several musical collaborations with her including touring work with the Yellow Magic Orchestra. Together, they had a daughter, the singer Miu Sakamoto. Sakamoto's second marriage ended in August 2006, 14 years after a mutual decision to live separately. He then married his manager, Norika Sora, with whom he had one child, Neo Sora, an artist and filmmaker. Sakamoto lived primarily in New York City from 1990 until 2020, when he returned to Tokyo.

=== Health and death ===
Beginning in June 2014, Sakamoto took a year-long break after he was diagnosed with oropharyngeal cancer. In 2015, he returned, saying, "Right now I'm good. I feel better. Much, much better. I feel energy inside, but you never know. The cancer might come back in three years, five years, maybe 10 years. Also the radiation makes your immune system really low. It means I'm very susceptible to another cancer in my body."

On January 21, 2021, Sakamoto shared a letter on his website announcing that though his throat cancer had gone into remission, he had been diagnosed with rectal cancer, and was undergoing treatment after a successful surgery. He wrote, "From now on, I will be living alongside cancer. But, I am hoping to make music for a little while longer."

Sakamoto died from cancer on March 28, 2023, at the age of 71. His death was announced on April 2, after his funeral had taken place.

== Activism ==
Sakamoto was a member of the anti-nuclear organization Stop Rokkasho and demanded the closing of the Hamaoka Nuclear Power Plant. In 2012, he organized the No Nukes 2012 concert, which featured performances by 18 groups, including Yellow Magic Orchestra and Kraftwerk. Sakamoto was also known as a critic of copyright law, arguing in 2009 that it is antiquated in the Information Age. He argued that in "the last 100 years, only a few organizations have dominated the music world and ripped off both fans and creators" and that "with the internet we are going back to having tribal attitudes towards music."

In 2015, Sakamoto also supported opposition to the relocation of Marine Corps Air Station Futenma in the Ōmura Bay in Henoko, with a new and Okinawan version of his 2004 single "Undercooled" whose sales partially contributed to the "Henoko Fund", aimed to stop the relocation of the base on Okinawa.

Sakamoto was also an environmentalist. In one of his last public activities before his death, he sent a letter to Tokyo Governor Yuriko Koike in early March 2023 calling for the suspension and review of the planned redevelopment of the Jingūmae neighborhood in Tokyo due to environmental concerns.

=== commmons ===
In 2006, Sakamoto, in collaboration with Japanese music company Avex Group, founded commmons (コモンズ, Komonzu), a record label seeking to change the manner in which music is produced. Sakamoto explained that commmons was not his label but is a platform for all aspiring artists to join as equal collaborators to share the benefits of the music industry. On the initiative's "About" page, the label is described as a project that "aims to find new possibilities for music, while making meaningful contribution to culture and society". The name "commmons" is spelt with three "m"s because the third "m" stands for music.

== Awards and nominations ==
Sakamoto won a number of awards for his work as a film composer, beginning with the BAFTA Award for Best Film Music for his score for Merry Christmas, Mr. Lawrence, in 1984. His greatest award success was for scoring The Last Emperor (1987), which won him the Academy Award for Best Original Score, Golden Globe Award for Best Original Score, and Grammy Award for Best Score Soundtrack Album for a Motion Picture, Television or Other Visual Media, as well as a BAFTA nomination in 1989.

His score for The Sheltering Sky (1990) won him his second Golden Globe Award, and his score for Little Buddha (1993) received another Grammy Award nomination. In 1997, his collaboration with Toshio Iwai, Music Plays Images X Images Play Music, was awarded the Golden Nica, the grand prize of the Prix Ars Electronica competition. He also contributed to the Academy Award winning soundtrack for Babel (2006) with several pieces of music, including the closing theme "Bibo no Aozora". In 2009, he was awarded the Ordre des Arts et des Lettres from France's Ministry of Culture for his musical contributions. His score for The Revenant (2015) was nominated for the Golden Globe and BAFTA, and won Best Musical Score from the Dallas–Fort Worth Film Critics Association.

Sakamoto won the Golden Pine Award (Lifetime Achievement) at the 2013 International Samobor Film Music Festival, along with Clint Eastwood and Gerald Fried.

=== Honorary awards ===
- 2009 – Ordre des Arts et des Lettres, from France's Ministry of Culture
- 2012 – FIAPF Award, Outstanding Achievement in Film, at the Asia Pacific Screen Awards
- 2013 – Golden Pine Award (Lifetime Achievement), at 2013 International Samobor Film Music Festival

=== Academy Award for Best Original Score ===
- 1987 – The Last Emperor (won)

=== BAFTA Award for Best Film Music ===
Sources:

- 1983 – Merry Christmas, Mr. Lawrence (won)
- 1987 – The Last Emperor (nominated)
- 2015 – The Revenant (nominated)

=== Grand Bell Awards|Grand Bell Awards for Best Music ===
- 2018 – The Fortress (won)

=== Golden Globe Award for Best Original Score ===
- 1987 – The Last Emperor (won)
- 1990 – The Sheltering Sky (won)
- 2015 – The Revenant (nominated)

=== Grammy Award for Best Score Soundtrack Album for a Motion Picture, Television or Other Visual Media ===
- 1987 – The Last Emperor (won)
- 1995 – Little Buddha (nominated)
- 2015 – The Revenant (nominated)

=== Hong Kong Film Award for Best Original Film Score ===
- 2022 – Love After Love (won)

==== Asian Film Awards for Best Composer ====
- 2012 – Hara-Kiri: Death of a Samurai (nominated)
- 2017 – Rage (nominated)

=== Other awards ===
- 1979 – Japan Record Awards, Best Arranger Award for "American Feelings" by Circus
- 1997 – Golden Nica, grand prize of Prix Ars Electronica, for Music Plays Images X Images Play Music

== Discography ==
Solo studio albums

- Thousand Knives (1978)
- B-2 Unit (1980)
- Left-handed Dream (1981)
- Ongaku Zukan (1984)
- Esperanto (1985)
- Futurista (1986)
- Neo Geo (1987)
- Beauty (1989)
- Heartbeat (1991)
- Sweet Revenge (1994)
- Smoochy (1995)
- 1996 (1996)
- Discord (1997)
- BTTB (1999)
- Comica (2002)
- Elephantism (2002)
- Chasm (2004)
- Out of Noise (2009)
- Playing the Piano (2009)
- Async (2017)
- 12 (2023)

== See also ==
- List of Academy Award winners and nominees from Japan
