= Annie Award for Outstanding Achievement for Character Animation in a Live Action Production =

Film award category

Annie Award for Character Animation in a Live Action Production
- Awarded for: Excellence in character animation
- Country: United States
- Presented by: ASIFA-Hollywood
- First award: 2010
- Currently held by: Kayn Garcia, Jean-Denis Haas, Meena Ibrahim, Nathan McConnel, and Nick Tripodi – How to Train Your Dragon (2025)
- Website: annieawards.org

The Annie Award for Character Animation in a Live Action Production is an Annie Award given annually to the best character animation for live action productions, including feature films and television series. It was first presented at the 38th Annie Awards.

Prior to the creation of this category, live-action productions were included in the Outstanding Achievement for Character Animation in a Feature Production category.

== Winners and nominees ==
=== 2010s ===
Year	Recipient(s)	Character	Film
2010 (38th)
2010 (38th)	Ryan Page		Alice in Wonderland
2010 (38th)	Quentin Miles		Clash of the Titans
2011 (39th)
2011 (39th)	Eric Reynolds		Rise of the Planet of the Apes
2011 (39th)	Andy Arnett		Hop
2011 (39th)	David Lowry		Paul
2011 (39th)	Mike Hull		Paul
2012 (40th)
2012 (40th)	Erik de Boer, Matt Shumway, Brian Wells, Vinayak Pawar, Michael Holzl	"Tiger"	Life of Pi
2012 (40th)	Jakub Pistecky, Maia Kayser, Scott Benza, Steve King, Kiran Bhat		The Avengers
2012 (40th)	Erik de Boer, Amanda Dague, Matt Brown, Mary Lynn Machado, Aaron Grey	"Orangutan"	Life of Pi
2012 (40th)	Mike Beaulieu, Roger Vizard, Atsushi Sato, Jackie Koehler, Derek Esparza, Richard Smith, Max Tyrie		The Amazing Spider-Man
2013 (41st)
2013 (41st)	Jeff Capogreco, Jedrzej Wojtowicz, Kevin Estey, Alessandro Bonora, Gino Acevedo	"Gollum"	The Hobbit: An Unexpected Journey
2013 (41st)	Hal Hickel, Chris Lentz, Derrick Carlin, Steve Rawlins, Kyle Winkelman		Pacific Rim
2013 (41st)	Dave Clayton, Simeon Duncombe, Jung Min Chang, Matthew Cioffi, Guillame Francois	"Goblin King"	The Hobbit: An Unexpected Journey
2014 (42nd)
2014 (42nd)	Daniel Barrett, Paul Story, Eteuati Tema, Alessandro Bonora, Dejan Momcilovic		Dawn of the Planet of the Apes
2014 (42nd)	Kevin Spruce, Dale Newton, Sidney Kombo, Chris Mullins, Brad Silby	"Rocket Raccoon"	Guardians of the Galaxy
2014 (42nd)	Eric Reynolds, David Clayton, Andreja Vuckovic, Guillaume Francois, Gios Johnston		The Hobbit: The Desolation of Smaug
2015 (43rd)
2015 (43rd)	Matthew Shumway, Adrian Millington, Blaine Toderian, Alexander Poei, Kevin Lan	"The Bear"	The Revenant
2015 (43rd)	Glen McIntosh, Kevin Martel, Kyle Winkelman, Rodrick Fransham, Kaori Ogino	"Indominus Rex"	Jurassic World
2015 (43rd)	Jakub Pistecky, Gang Trinh, Craig Penn, Mickael Coedel, Yair Gutierrez	"The Hulk"	Avengers: Age of Ultron
2015 (43rd)	Peter Tan, Boon Yik Lim, Sachio Nishiyama, Byounghee Cho, Roy Tan	"Ultron"	Avengers: Age of Ultron
2015 (43rd)	Aaron Gilman, Howard Sly, Matthew Riordan, Kevin Kelm, Guillaume Francois	"Azog"	The Hobbit: The Battle of the Five Armies
2015 (43rd)	David Clayton, Gios Johnston, Andreja Vuckovic, Guillaume Francois, Daniel Zettl	"Smaug"	The Hobbit: The Battle of the Five Armies
2016 (44th)
2016 (44th)	Andrew R. Jones, Peta Bayley, Gabriele Zucchelli, Benjamin Jones		The Jungle Book
2016 (44th)	Steve Rawlins, Ebrahim Jahromi, Cedric Lo, Stephen King, Yair Gutierrez	"Spider-Man"	Captain America: Civil War
2016 (44th)	Nicholas Tripodi, Dean Elliott, James Hollingworth, Matt Weaver		Game of Thrones (Episode: "Battle of the Bastards")
2016 (44th)	Andrew R. Jones, Paul Story, Dennis Yoo, Eteuati Tema, Andrei Coval		The Jungle Book
2016 (44th)	Hal Hickel, Jee Young Park, Kai-Hua Lan, Cedric Lo, KimHuat Ooi	"Orcs"	Warcraft
2017 (45th)
2017 (45th)	Daniel Barrett, Sidney Kombo-Kintombo, Emile Ghorayeb, Luisma Lavin Peredo, Alessandro Bonora		War for the Planet of the Apes
2017 (45th)	Paul Story, Todd Labonte, Matthew Muntean, Cajun Hylton, Georgy Arevshatov		Game of Thrones (Episode: "Beyond the Wall")
2017 (45th)	Arslan Elver, Liam Russell, Alvise Avati, Alessandro Ciucci		Guardians of the Galaxy Vol. 2
2017 (45th)	Jance Rubinchik, Adrian Millington, Alberto Martinez Arce, Kyle Winkelman	"Kong"	Kong: Skull Island
2017 (45th)	Andrei Coval, Paul Story, Eric Reynolds, Olivier Lesaint, Artur Vill		Valerian and the City of a Thousand Planets
2018 (46th)
2018 (46th)	Chris Sauvé, James Baxter, Sandro Cleuzo		Mary Poppins Returns
2018 (46th)	Paul Story, Sidney Kombo-Kintombo, Eteuati Tema, Jacob Luamanuvae-Su'a, Sam Sharplin		Avengers: Infinity War
2018 (46th)	Arslan Elver, Laurent Laban, Kayn Garcia, Claire Blustin, Marc-André Coulombe		Christopher Robin
2018 (46th)	Pablo Grillo, Laurent Laban, Kyle Dunlevy, Stuart Ellis, Liam Russell		Paddington 2
2018 (46th)	Richard Oey, Adrien Annesley, Allison Orr, Wei Liang Yap, Shan Hao		The Nutcracker and the Four Realms
2019 (47th)
2019 (47th)	Sidney Kombo-Kintombo, Sam Sharplin, Keven Norris, Tim Teramoto, Jacob Luamanuvae-Su'a		Avengers: Endgame
2019 (47th)	Michael Cozens, Mark Haenga, Tom Holzinger, Rachel Hydes, David Short		Alita: Battle Angel
2019 (47th)	Jason Snyman, Sheik Ghafoor, Maia Neubig, Michael Siegel, Cheri Fojtik		Game of Thrones (Episode: "The Long Night")
2019 (47th)	Dale Newton, Waiyin Mendoza, Rochelle Flynn, Leila Gaed, Paul Jones		Pokémon Detective Pikachu
2019 (47th)	Joakim Riedinger		Spider-Man: Far from Home

=== 2020s ===
Year	Recipient(s)	Character	Film
2020 (48th)
2020 (48th)	Nathan Fitzgerald, Leo Ito, Chris Rogers, Eung Ho Lo, Emily Luk		The Mandalorian
2020 (48th)	Nick Stein, Caroline Ting, Sebastian Trujillo, David Yabu, Paul Ramsden		The Christmas Chronicles 2
2020 (48th)	Aidan Martin, Hunter Parks, Craig Young, Viki Yeo, Krystal Sae Eua		The Umbrella Academy (Season 2)
2020 (48th)	Anders Beer, Marianne Morency, Hennadii Prykhodko, Sophie Burie, Cedric Le Poullennec		Timmy Failure: Mistakes Were Made
2021 (49th)
2021 (49th)	Karl Rapley, Sebastian Trujillo, Richard John Moore, Merlin Bela Wassilij Maertz, Pascal Raimbault		Shang-Chi and the Legend of the Ten Rings
2021 (49th)	Thomas Becker, Daniel Cavalcante, Philipp Winterstein, Victor Dinis, Thiago Martins		Flora & Ulysses
2021 (49th)	Meena Ibrahim, Alvise Avati, Nicholas Cabana, Adam Goldstein, Lea Vera Toro		The Suicide Squad
2021 (49th)	Carmelo Leggiero, Cajun Hylton, Michel Alencar Magalhaes, Florent Limouzin, Dave Clayton		The Tomorrow War
2021 (49th)	Industrial Light & Magic Animation Team		Y: The Last Man
2022 (50th)
2022 (50th)	Daniel Barrett, Stuart Adcock, Todd Labonte, Douglas McHale, Stephen Cullingford		Avatar: The Way of Water
2022 (50th)	Alvise Avati, Chris McGaw, Bora Şahin, Krzysztof Boyoko, Laurent Benhamo		Beast
2022 (50th)	Simon Allen, Harinarayan Rajeev, Paul Nelson, Matthias Schoenegger		Finch
2022 (50th)	Jance Rubinchik, Alexander Lee, Rich Bentley, Antoine Verney Carron, Sally Wilson		Jurassic World Dominion
2022 (50th)	Michael Cozens, Mark Smith, Kai-Hua Lan, Selene McLean, Richard John Moore		Peacemaker
2023 (51st)
2023 (51st)	Fernando Herrera, Chris Hurtt, Nathan McConnel, Daniel Cabral, and Chris McGaw		Guardians of the Galaxy Vol. 3
2023 (51st)	Rick O'Connor, Mike Beaulieu, Stewart Alves, Kevin Reuter, and Wai Kit Wan		Ahsoka
2023 (51st)	Carmelo Leggiero, Steve Braggs, Kevin Kelm, Cedric Enriquez Canlas, and Kane Elferink		Cocaine Bear
2023 (51st)	Pablo Grillo, Kayn Garcia, Ferran Casas, Stuart Ellis, and Joseph Lewis		The Little Mermaid
2023 (51st)	Kevin Estey, Kai-Hua Lan, Blaine Toderian Toderian, Richard John Moore, and Joseph C.K Leong		Transformers: Rise of the Beasts
2024 (52nd)
2024 (52nd)	Christian Kickenweitz, Aidan Martin, Allison Orr, Radiya Alam, and Howard Sly		Kingdom of the Planet of the Apes
2024 (52nd)	Shaun Freeman, Luisma Lavin Peredo, Carlos Lin, Seoungseok Charlie Kim, and Kaori Miyazawa		Better Man
2024 (52nd)	Kyle Dunlevy, Philipp Winterstein, Gil Daniel, Michael Elder, and Julien Bagory		Gladiator II
2024 (52nd)	Ludovic Chailloleau, Jonathan Paquin, Craig Penn, Florian Fernandez, and Marco Barbati		Godzilla x Kong: The New Empire
2024 (52nd)	Jason Snyman, Manjoe Chan, Chloe McLean, Cedric Enriquez Canlas, and Vincent Lee		House of the Dragon (Season 2)
2025 (53rd)
2025 (53rd)	Kayn Garcia, Jean-Denis Haas, Meena Ibrahim, Nathan McConnel, and Nick Tripodi		How To Train Your Dragon
2025 (53rd)	Kevin Estey, Anthony McIndoe, Jade Lorier, Caroline Ting, and Luisma Lavin Peredo		A Minecraft Movie
2025 (53rd)	Sidney Kombo-Kintombo, Andrew William Park, Marco Röth, Paul Seyb, and Thien Ly		Captain America: Brave New World
2025 (53rd)	Adrien Annesley, Alvise Avati, Riyad Chalakkara, Daniel Mizuguchi, and Liam Russell		Prehistoric Planet: Ice Age
2025 (53rd)	Loic Mireault, Michael Elder, Philipp Winterstein, Victor Dinis, and Diego de Paula		Superman

== See also ==
- Visual Effects Society Award for Outstanding Animated Character in a Photoreal Feature
