= Cong Su =

Chinese composer

This is a Chinese name; the family name is Su.

Cong Su (simplified Chinese: 苏聪; traditional Chinese: 蘇聰; pinyin: Sū Cōng; born 1957 in Tianjin, China) is a Chinese composer.

He studied at the Central Conservatory of Music in Beijing, then in Germany. He has lectured on music theory, music analysis, film music, and ballet music at the Musikhochschule in Munich. Since 1991, he has been a professor of film and media composition at the newly founded State Film Academy in the Stuttgart area.

Together with Ryuichi Sakamoto and David Byrne, Su won the Best Original Score Academy Award for the Bernardo Bertolucci film The Last Emperor in 1987; the soundtrack album won the Best Score Soundtrack for Visual Media award at the 31st Annual Grammy Awards in 1989.

Su divides his time between Beijing, Lake Constance, and Lucca, Italy.

== Works ==
=== Film ===
- The Last Emperor – Soundtrack (1987)
- Green Tea (2002)
- Jasmine Women (2004)
