= The Last Emperor (album) =

Soundtrack album by Ryuichi Sakamoto, David Byrne & Cong Su
- Released: December 8, 1987
- Studio: Onkio Haus, Kato Studio, Aoyama Studio, and CBS/Sony Roppongi Studios; (Tokyo); Abbey Road Studios, CTS Studios, Odyssey Studios, and Lillie Yard Studio; (London); Electric Lady Studios; (New York City)
- Genre: Soundtrack
- Length: 50:17
- Label: Virgin
- Producer: Ryuichi Sakamoto; David Byrne

Ryuichi Sakamoto chronology
Neo Geo (1987)	The Last Emperor (1987)	Beauty (1989)

David Byrne chronology
Sounds from True Stories (1986)	The Last Emperor (1987)	Rei Momo (1989)

The Last Emperor is the soundtrack album for the film of the same name. It features nine pieces composed by Ryuichi Sakamoto, five by David Byrne, one from Cong Su, and a few incidental pieces of source music. The album won the Best Original Score award at the 1987 Academy Awards, and won the Best Score Soundtrack for Visual Media award at the 31st Annual Grammy Awards in 1989.

== Track listing ==
No.	Title	Artist(s)	Length
1.	"First Coronation"	Ryuichi Sakamoto	1:46
2.	"Open the Door"	Ryuichi Sakamoto	2:54
3.	"Where Is Armo?"	Ryuichi Sakamoto	2:26
4.	"Picking Up Brides"	Ryuichi Sakamoto	2:39
5.	"The Last Emperor – Theme Variation 1"	Ryuichi Sakamoto	2:19
6.	"Rain (I Want a Divorce)"	Ryuichi Sakamoto	1:49
7.	"The Baby (Was Born Dead)"	Ryuichi Sakamoto	0:55
8.	"The Last Emperor – Theme Variation 2"	Ryuichi Sakamoto	4:28
9.	"The Last Emperor – Theme"	Ryuichi Sakamoto	5:54
10.	"Main Title Theme (The Last Emperor)"	David Byrne	4:01
11.	"Picking a Bride"	David Byrne	2:00
12.	"Bed"	David Byrne	5:00
13.	"Wind, Rain, and Water"	David Byrne	2:18
14.	"Paper Emperor"	David Byrne	1:49
15.	"Lunch"	Cong Su	4:54
16.	"Red Guard (Sailing the Seas Depends on the Helmsman)"	The Red Guard Accordion Band	1:20
17.	"The Emperor's Waltz"	Berliner Philharmoniker - Herbert von Karajan	3:06
18.	"The Red Guard Dance"	The Girls Red Guard Dancers	0:39

== Personnel ==
Production

- Ryuichi Sakamoto – composer, producer, performer
- David Byrne – composer, producer, performer, arranger, mixer
- Cong Su – composer, performer
- Gavyn Wright – conductor
- Aki Ikuta – associate producer
- Hans Zimmer – associate producer, programmer
- Hiro Sugawara – programmer
- Kayo Itose – production secretary
- Ray Williams – music supervisor
- Kōji Ueno – arranger
- Lau Hong Quan – arranger
- Yuji Nomi – arranger

Technical

- Hayden Bendall – engineer
- Mike Jarratt – engineer
- Shinichi Tanaka – engineer
- Clive Martin – engineer
- Ian Sylvester – engineer
- Michio Nakagoshi – engineer
- Shigeru Takise – engineer
- Greg Fulginiti & Greg Calbi – mastering
- Glen Rosenstein – mixer
- Steve Nye – mixer
- Mark Roule – mixer

== Charts ==
Chart (1988)	Peak position
Australia (Kent Music Report)	93
US Billboard 200	152

== Impact ==
The film "brought Sakamoto's work to international attention, and as a direct result of its success he went on to work with Italian director Bernardo Bertolucci.’’
