= Esperanto (Ryuichi Sakamoto album) =

1985 album by Ryūichi Sakamoto

Studio album by Ryuichi Sakamoto
- Released: October 5, 1985
- Studio: Onkio Haus
- Genres: Experimental; electronic; ambient; minimal; proto-techno; world
- Length: 39:14
- Labels: School; Midi
- Producer: Ryuichi Sakamoto

Ryuichi Sakamoto chronology
Ongaku Zukan (1984)	Esperanto (1985)	Futurista (1986)

Esperanto is the fifth solo studio album by Japanese musician Ryuichi Sakamoto. Released in 1985, it was commissioned for a dance of the same name by choreographer Molissa Fenley, which debuted in New York City in 1985. The experimental electronic music album includes layers of sampled voices, and marks a look back at Sakamoto's non-pop-oriented second solo album, B-2 Unit. The album includes contributions from Yaz-Kaz and Arto Lindsay.

The album reached number 9 on the Oricon LP chart. Released in Japan on Midi, Inc.'s School label, Esperanto did not see a US release until 2021. The track "A Rain Song" bears a resemblance to the logo music later used by video game company Capcom in the 1990s.

== Reception ==
The performance debuted at the Joyce Theater to a mixed review from Anna Kisselgoff at The New York Times, who said of Sakamoto's music that the "sound often resembles a radio shut on and off." The album itself went on to receive more positive reviews. Jen Monroe of The Baffler said the sample-based music "manages to be unremittingly gorgeous, aggressive, angular, and lush."

Professional ratings
Review scores
Source	Rating
AllMusic	3.5/5 stars

AllMusic called it "one of Sakamoto's strangest, most uncompromising albums," using "weird, clipped samples of ethnic instruments, electronically modified sound bites, and distorted vocals," to build "a very icy soundscape that juts out at the listener like pointy modernist architecture." He said "Adelic Penguins" is "the closest Sakamoto gets to techno here, with bits and bops of a melody exploding over a propulsive bassline."

Logan Takahashi, writing for Vice in 2016, gave Esperanto a positive review, saying it is "perhaps my favorite album" of Sakamoto. He said the "sounds he uses here define so much of the ‘digital‑organic’ sound that still resonates especially well today" as if it "leapt over the following three decades and landed in some kind of dialogue with today." He lists "A Rain Song" as his favourite track from the album. He also said the music software Omnisphere "has a lot to owe to this album."

== Track listing ==
All songs written by Ryuichi Sakamoto.

Esperanto track listing
No.	Title	Length
1.	"A Wongga Dance Song"	6:18
2.	"The Dreaming"	3:51
3.	"A Rain Song"	2:28
4.	"Dolphins"	3:21
5.	"A Human Tube"	4:50
6.	"Adelic Penguins"	6:06
7.	"A Carved Stone"	8:23
8.	"Ulu Watu"	3:57

== Personnel ==
- Ryuichi Sakamoto – composer, performer, producer, arranger, remixer
- Yaz-Kaz – percussion
- Arto Lindsay – electric guitar
- Shigeru Takise – engineering, remixing
- Naoto Shibuya – engineering assistant
- Tohru Kotetsu – mastering
- Hiroshi Okura – executive producer
- Tsuguya Inoue for Beans – art direction
