= Richard McBride (visual effects) =

American visual effects supervisor

- Occupation: Visual effects supervisor
- Years active: 1997–present

Richard McBride is an American visual effects supervisor. He worked on various feature films, including Gravity (2013) and The Revenant (2015).

In 2016, Richard McBride was nominated at the 88th Academy Awards for his work on the film The Revenant in the category for Best Visual Effects. His nomination was shared with Cameron Waldbauer, Matt Shumway and Jason Smith.

== Filmography ==
- 2013: Gravity
- 2015: The Revenant
- 2018: A Wrinkle in Time
