= Rei Harakami =

Rei Harakami レイ・ハラカミ
- Harakami in 2009

Background information
- Born: 原神 玲 10 December 1970; Hiroshima, Japan
- Origin: Kyoto, Japan
- Died: 27 July 2011 (aged 40)
- Genres: Electronic, ambient
- Occupation: Record producer
- Years active: 1995–2011
- Label: Sublime Records
- Formerly of: Yanokami; Akiko Yano

Rei Harakami (原神 玲, Harakami Rei; 10 December 1970 – 27 July 2011) was a Japanese record producer from Hiroshima. He was based in Kyoto. He was one half of the duo Yanokami along with Akiko Yano.

== Biography ==
Rei Harakami attended the Kyoto University of Arts and originally intended to become a filmmaker. While creating soundtracks for film projects Harakami gradually started to focus on music and signed with Sublime Records in 1996. He released his debut EP, titled Rei Harakami EP, in 1997. His first studio album, Unrest, was released in 1998. It was followed by Opa*q (1999), Red Curb (2001), and Lust (2005).

He died of a brain hemorrhage on 27 July 2011.

== Discography ==
=== Studio albums ===
- Unrest (1998)
- Opa*q (1999)
- Red Curb (2001)
- Lust (2005)
- Wasuremono (2006)
- The World of Kawagoe Rendezvous (2011) (with U-Zhaan)

=== Compilation albums ===
- Wide world (1990–1991)
- Small world: rei harakami selected works 1991–1993 (1991–1993)
- Trace of Red Curb (2001)
- Colors of the Dark (2006) (featuring Ikuko Harada)
- Asage: Selected Re-Mix & Re-Arrangement Works 1 (2009)
- Yūge: Selected Re-Mix & Re-Arrangement Works 2 (2009)

=== Soundtrack albums ===
- Tennen Kokekkō (2007)

=== EPs ===
- Rei Harakami EP (1997)
- November EP (1998)
- Blind / Swap EP (2000)
- Joy for Joy EP (2005)
- Evaporater EP (2006)

=== Singles ===
- "Red Curb Again" (2001)
