= Neo Geo (album) =

Studio album by Ryuichi Sakamoto
- Released: July 1, 1987 (Japan)
- Genres: Fusion, electronica, synth-pop, folk, world
- Length: 34:42
- Label: Sony Music
- Producers: Bill Laswell, Ryuichi Sakamoto

Ryuichi Sakamoto chronology
Media Bahn Live (1986)	Neo Geo (1987)	The Last Emperor (1987)

Professional ratings
Review scores
Source	Rating
AllMusic	3/5 stars
Tom Hull	B

Neo Geo is a 1987 album by Ryuichi Sakamoto. The term "neo geo", or "new world", is derived from Sakamoto himself as a way to describe worldwide musical diversity in regard to genre (similar to world music and world beat).

The track "Risky" featuring Iggy Pop on vocals was released as a single with another track from Neo Geo "After All" as the B-side. The music video for "Risky" was directed by Meiert Avis and was released in two different versions to accompany the 7" and 12" extended version of the song. The latter contains scenes of female nudity.

== Track listing ==
No.	Title	Written By	Length
1.	"Before Long"	Ryuichi Sakamoto	1:20
2.	"Neo Geo"	Traditional (arr. Sakamoto & Bill Laswell)	5:08
3.	"Risky"	James Osterberg, Sakamoto, Laswell	5:26
4.	"Free Trading"	Yuji Nomi, Yu Hagiwara	5:28
5.	"Shogunade"	Sakamoto, Laswell	4:32
6.	"Parata"	Sakamoto	4:21
7.	"Okinawa Song – Chin Nuku Juushii"	Shinichi Mita, Hiroshi Asa	5:19
8.	"After All"	Sakamoto	3:08
Total length:			34:42

== Personnel ==
Performers

- Ryuichi Sakamoto – keyboard, piano, computer
- Yukio Tsuji – shakuhachi, gayageum
- Iggy Pop – vocals (3)
- Kazumi Tamaki – vocals
- Misako Koja – vocals
- Yoriko Ganeko – vocals
- Junemei Wu – voice
- Bill Laswell – bass
- David Van Tieghem – percussions
- Bootsy Collins – bass
- William "Bootsy" Collins – star bass
- Emmett Chapman – Chapman stick
- Tony Williams – drums
- Sly Dunbar – drums
- Eddie Martinez – 12 string guitar
- Harry Kubota – guitar
- Lucia Hwong – pipa

Technical

- Jason Corsaro – mixing
- Clive Smith – programmer (synthesizer, Fairlight CMI)
- Hiro Sugawara – programmer (synthesizer, Fairlight CMI)
- Masa Sekijima – programmer (synthesizer, Fairlight CMI)
- Jeff Bova – programmer (synthesizer)

== Charts ==
Chart (1987)	Peak position
Japanese Albums (Oricon)	8

== See also ==
- 1987 in Japanese music
