= Akiko Yano =

Japanese jazz and pop singer (born 1955)

- Born: February 13, 1955 (age 71); Tokyo, Japan
- Genres: Disco; electronic; funk; pop; jazz; new wave; pop rock; synth-pop; soul
- Occupations: Singer; musician; composer
- Instruments: Vocals; piano; synthesizer; keyboards
- Years active: 1970s–present

Akiko Yano (矢野 顕子, Yano Akiko; born Akiko Suzuki (鈴木 顕子, Suzuki Akiko); February 13, 1955) is a Japanese pop and jazz musician and singer. Born in Tokyo, she was raised in Aomori and began her singing career in the mid-1970s. She has been called "one of the major musical talents of the Japanese popular music world". Her vocals and eclectic style have often been compared to her slightly later English contemporary Kate Bush.

She has recorded with Yellow Magic Orchestra and its members Ryuichi Sakamoto, Haruomi Hosono and Yukihiro Takahashi, as well as with Swing Out Sister, Pat Metheny, The Chieftains, Lyle Mays, members of Little Feat, David Sylvian, Mick Karn, Kenji Omura, Gil Goldstein, Toninho Horta, Mino Cinelu, Jeff Bova, Charlie Haden, Peter Erskine, Anthony Jackson, David Rhodes, Bill Frisell, Thomas Dolby, the band Quruli, Rei Harakami as Yanokami and her daughter Miu Sakamoto.

== Biography ==
=== Early life ===
Akiko Yano was born Akiko Suzuki in Tokyo in 1955. She grew up in Aomori, Japan, and learned to play the piano when she was three. She dropped out of high school and moved to Tokyo at the age of fifteen to become a professional musician. She quickly became involved in the city's jazz scene, and by seventeen was working as a studio recording artist for hire. She also performed with the band Tin Pan Alley.

=== Solo career ===
Yano's debut album, Japanese Girl, was released on July 25, 1976, was a major hit in Japan, and gave Yano overnight success. The album was recorded in Los Angeles with Little Feat, and of the album's ten tracks, she wrote nine of them. The album has been praised for its unique blend of different musical styles such as jazz, pop, blues, and traditional Japanese folk music, and "still sounds fresh today", according to Paul Bowler of Record Collector magazine. The success led to her self-producing the second album, Iroha Ni Konpeitou, which was released in 1977. It was recorded primarily in Japan, and features Yano improvising on a variety of instruments, backed up by prominent musicians such as Rick Marotta and Haruomi Hosono. Around this time, Yano started collaborating with Yellow Magic Orchestra and joined them on two world tours. They also played as the backing band for her 1980 album Gohan Ga Dekitayo, which translates to "Dinner's Ready", and marked a shift in her musical style towards electro-pop. The album was also one of the earliest CDs ever released in 1982.

1981's Tadaima ("I'm Home") has become one of the most beloved of Yano's discography, and also one of her personal favorites. The record company asked for an album that would be a commercial success, so Yano gave them what they wanted on side one, but took side two in a different avant-garde direction, composed around nine short stories that were written by children. The album once again featured the Yellow Magic Orchestra, as well as a cartoonish heta-uma cover designed by Teruhiko Yumura, but was only released in Japan. The album's single "Harusaki Kobeni" was released before the album was recorded, and reached the top 40 chart after being used in cosmetics commercials.

Yano was introduced to British band, Japan, by Ryuichi Sakamoto of the Yellow Magic Orchestra, and in 1982 they met at the AIR Studios in London to record an album, Ai Ga Nakucha Ne ("There Must Be Love"). The record company, Japan Record, released the album as a set with a book of photography and at a lower price, as requested by Yano. After her 1984 album Oh Hisse, Oh Hisse, Yano took a one-year break from recording music to raise her children, and decided to refocus her career on jazz, which led to the 1989 album Welcome Back featuring Pat Metheny, Charlie Haden and Peter Erskine. She relocated to New York City in 1990.

=== Other projects ===
Yano's credits extend beyond her album projects. She was showcased by Japanese animation film company Studio Ghibli, which is known for works such as Princess Mononoke and Spirited Away. Yano composed the music for the film My Neighbors the Yamadas (as well as performing a minor role as Fujihara-sensei) and created and performed the sound effects using only her voice for two short films Yadosagashi and Mizugumo Monmon by animation director Hayao Miyazaki. Both films were shown at the Ghibli Museum in Mitaka, Tokyo. More recently in 2008, Yano performed as a voiceover actress on Ponyo on the Cliff by the Sea as Ponyo's sisters. In addition, Yano composed music for Toei's animated feature, Atashin'chi and piano-based soundtrack for the film Tagatameni.

As an international artist, Yano has toured Europe extensively, performing at The Montreux Jazz Festival, Café de la Danse, and Cité de la Musique in Paris. In 2002, she also performed a week of special concerts at Pizza Express in London. In the United States, Yano has performed in Los Angeles, San Francisco, Seattle, Boston and New York City where she periodically plays concerts throughout the year at Joe's Pub at the New York Public Theater. In July 2009, she performed at the North Sea Jazz Festival along with fellow pianist Hiromi Uehara. In recent years she has appeared at the Blue Note in New York as a guest performer for Janis Siegel of The Manhattan Transfer, and as part of a trio with Anthony Jackson on bass and Cliff Almond on drums in concerts at the Blue Note Tokyo since 2003. In 2008, New York guitarist Marc Ribot joined Yano for sold-out shows at the Blue Note Tokyo.

Yano joined with Rei Harakami to create the duo Yanokami, and in 2007 they released their first studio album Yanokami. In 2009, Will Lee and Chris Parker joined her to form the Akiko Yano Trio.

== Discography ==
Solo studio albums

- Japanese Girl (1976)
- Iroha ni Konpeitō (1977)
- To Ki Me Ki (1978)
- Gohan ga Dekitayo (1980)
- Tadaima. (1981)
- Ai ga Nakuchane. (1982)
- OSOS (1984)
- Tōge No Wagaya (1986)
- Brooch (1986)
- Granola (1987)
- Welcome Back (1989)
- Love Life (1991)
- Super Folk Song (1992)
- Love Is Here (1993)
- Elephant Hotel (1994)
- Piano Nightly (1996)
- Oui Oui (1997)
- Go Girl (1999)
- Home Girl Journey (2000)
- Reverb (2002)
- Honto No Kimochi (2004)
- Akiko (2008)
- Ongakudo (2010)
- Yano Akiko, Imawano Kiyoshirō o Utau (2013)
- Tobashite Ikuyo (2014)
- Welcome to Jupiter (2015)
- Soft Landing (2017)
- Futaribocchi de Ikou (2018)
- Asteroid and Butterfly (2020)
- Music Is a Gift (2021)
- TO THE LIVING CREATURES (2026)

== Personal life ==
Yano married and soon after divorced Makoto Yano, the producer of her first recording. In 1975, her son Fuuta Yano was born. She later married fellow musician Ryuichi Sakamoto, with whom she had a daughter, Miu Sakamoto. The young couple can be seen playing a duet on the piano at home in the 1985 documentary Tokyo Melody. Yano separated from him in 1992, and they divorced in August 2006. Yano is Christian.
