= Matt Shumway =

American animation supervisor (born 1978)

- Born: 1978 (age 46–47)
- Occupation: Animation Supervisor
- Years active: 2002-present

Matt Shumway (born 1978) is an Animation Supervisor known for his works in Life of Pi (2012) and The Revenant (2015).

Matt Shumway was nominated at the 88th Academy Awards for his work on the film The Revenant in the category of Best visual effects. His nomination was shared with Cameron Waldbauer, Richard McBride and Jason Smith. For his work in that film, Shumway also received a nomination for the Outstanding Achievement, Character Animation in a Live Action Production at the Annie Awards.
