= Sakanaquarium 2012: Zepp Alive =

Live album by Sakanaction
- Released: November 14, 2012
- Recorded: June 19, 2012
- Genre: Dance rock, electronica, pop
- Length: 1:25:46
- Language: Japanese
- Label: Victor Entertainment
- Producer: Sakanaction

Sakanaction chronology
Documentaly (2011)	Sakanaquarium 2012: Zepp Alive (2012)	Sakanaction (2013)

Sakanaquarium 2012: Zepp Alive is a live album by Japanese band Sakanaction. A recording of their June 19, 2012, performance at Zepp Tokyo, the album was released on November 14, 2012, through Victor Entertainment and an exclusive digital download to iTunes.

== Background and production ==
In 2008 and 2009, Sakanaction released two live extended plays: 'Night Fishing Is Good' Tour 2008 in Sapporo, on August 6, 2008, and "Fish Alive" 30min., 1 Sequence by 6 Songs Sakanaquarium 2009 @ Sapporo on July 15, 2009. Since then, Sakanaction began releasing concerts to DVD: Sakanaquarium 2010 (B) and Sakanaquarium 2010 (C) in 2011, followed by Sakanaquarium 2011 Documentaly: Live at Makuhari Messe, a recording from the band's tour to promote their sixth album Documentaly (2011), on March 28, 2012.

Since the release of the DVD, Sakanaction released the single "Boku to Hana" in March 2012, used as the theme song for the Fuji Television drama San Jū Nana-sai de Isha ni Natta Boku: Kenshūi Junjō Monogatari. In May and June 2012, the band performed a tour of the Zepp concert halls across Japan. The band felt free to select any songs that they wanted to perform live for these concerts, as the band were not specifically touring an album for these concerts. In August 2012, the band released the single "Yoru no Odoriko", which was packaged with a DVD featuring six performances from their Sakanaquarium 2012 Zepp Alive concert at Zepp Tokyo. Though "Yoru no Odoriko" was recorded with the audience present, the remaining songs were recorded in the empty concert call before the audience arrived, in a performance entitled Zepp Alive Alone.

== Release and reception ==
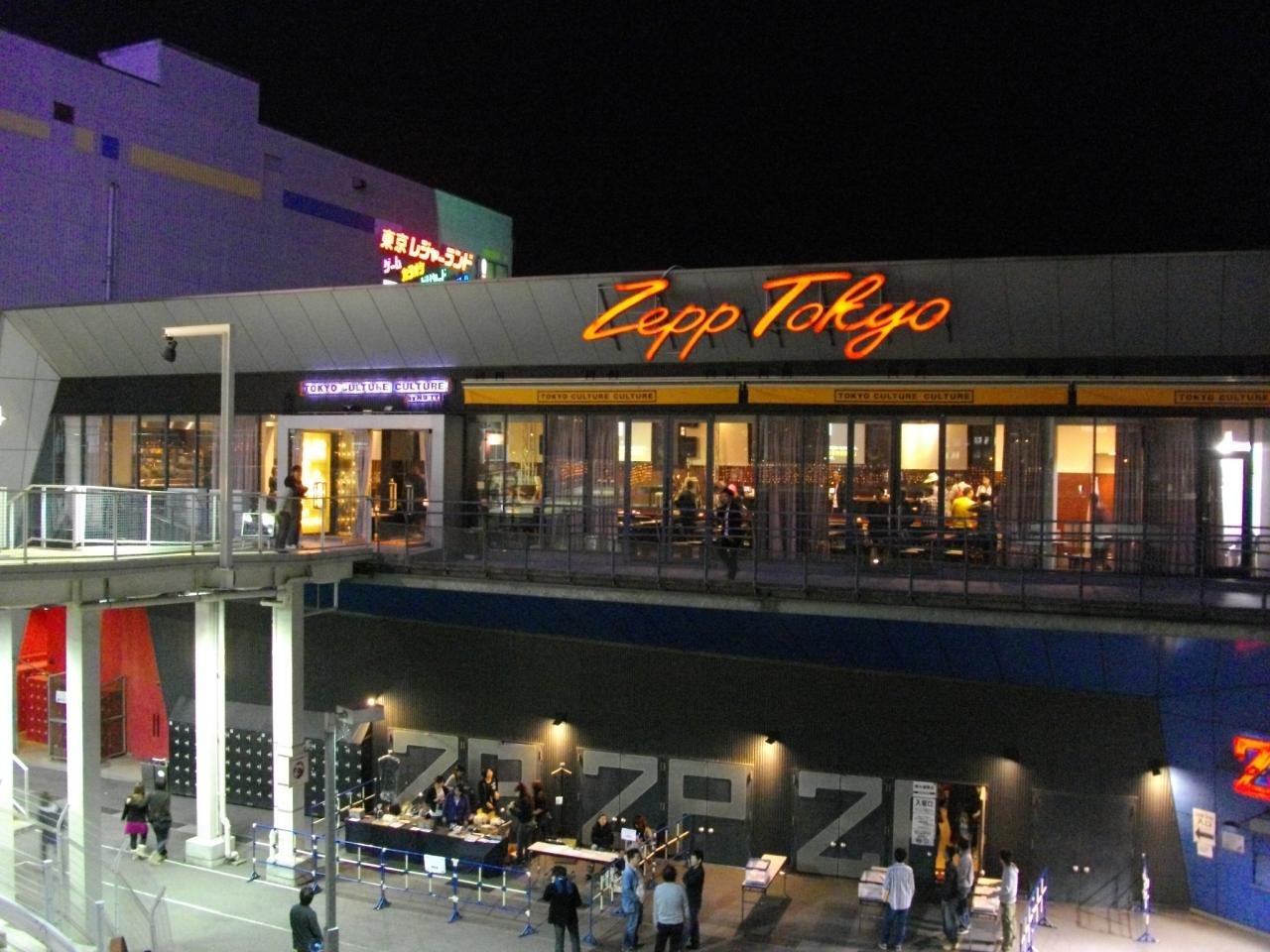
The album was recorded at the Zepp Tokyo concert hall on June 19, 2012.

The concert, the final performance of their Zepp tour, was performed at Zepp Tokyo on June 19 in front of an audience by 2,500 people. The album features the main section of the concert, and removes the two encores, featuring the songs "Ame (B)", "Light Dance", "Yoru no Odoriko", "Night Fishing Is Good" and "Mikazuki Sunset". The concert was recorded with a high spec camera, and although the pre-concert recordings featured on the "Yoru no Odoriko" single utilised a double microphone binaural recording set-up for Ichiro Yamaguchi's vocals, the actual concert was recorded with standard audio.

In addition to the seventeen songs featured on the album and the opening sequence, the album was packaged with a visual file, Sequence of 18 Tracks, featuring the concert's visual footage. A video recording of the band's song "Yoru no Odoriko" was also released as a digital download on the same day as the album, despite not being featured on the album, which had originally been released on the "Yoru no Odoriko" single's DVD.

A selection of seven songs from the video footage of the concert were compiled on the visual disc of Sakanaction's 2013 album Sakanaction: "Opening", "Klee", "Sen to Rei", "Fukurō", "Holy Dance", "Inner World" and "Sample".

== Track listing ==
All tracks are written by Ichiro Yamaguchi.

No.	Title	Music	Length
1.	"Opening"		4:02
2.	"Klee"		4:14
3.	"Aruku Around" (アルクアラウンド Aruku Araundo, "Walk Around")		4:30
4.	"Sen to Rei" (セントレイ, "1000 & 0")		3:51
5.	"Monochrome Tokyo" (モノクロトウキョー Monokuro Tōkyō)		4:20
6.	"Fukurō" (フクロウ, "Owl")		5:47
7.	"Kabe" (壁, "Wall")		4:57
8.	"Neptunus" (ネプトゥーヌス Neputūnusu)		6:23
9.	"Bach no Senritsu o Yoru ni Kiita Sei Desu" (『バッハの旋律を夜に聴いたせいです。』, "It's Because of Listening to Bach Melodies at Night")		4:16
10.	"Holy Dance" (ホーリーダンス Hōrī Dansu)		5:29
11.	"Inner World" (インナーワールド Innā Wārudo)		4:15
12.	"Sample" (サンプル Sanpuru)		6:10
13.	"Boku to Hana" (僕と花, "The Flower and I")		3:59
14.	"Boku to Hana (Sakanaction Remix)"		5:58
15.	"Native Dancer" (ネイティブダンサー Neitibu Dansā)		5:31
16.	"Identity" (アイデンティティ Aidentiti)		4:54
17.	"Rookie" (ルーキー Rūkī)		5:45
18.	"Endless" (エンドレス Endoresu)	Yamaguchi	3:47
Total length:			1:25:46

Visual media track
No.	Title	Length
19.	"Sakanaquarium Zepp Alive 2012 Sequence of 18 Tracks"	1:28:55
Total length:		2:54:41

== Release history ==
Region	Date	Format	Distributing Label	Catalog codes
Japan	November 14, 2012	digital download	Victor Entertainment	VEATP-26483
