= Yoru no Odoriko =

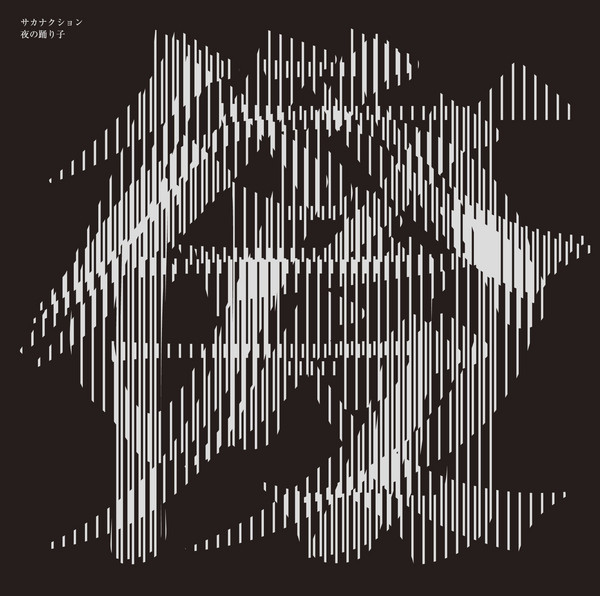

Single by Sakanaction

from the album Sakanaction
- Released: August 29, 2012
- Recorded: 2012
- Genre: Dance rock
- Length: 5:06
- Label: Victor Entertainment
- Songwriter: Ichiro Yamaguchi
- Producer: Sakanaction

Sakanaction singles chronology
"Boku to Hana" (2012)	"Yoru no Odoriko" (2012)	"Music" (2013)

Music video
- "Yoru no Odoriko" on YouTube

"Yoru no Odoriko" (Japanese: 夜の踊り子; "Dancer of the Night") (Japanese pronunciation: [joɾɯ no odoɾiko]) is a song by Japanese band Sakanaction. Commissioned by the design school Mode Gakuen for commercials starring Jonte' Moaning, it was released as a single on August 29, 2012. A high tempo song with elements of dance, pop and rock, "Yoru no Odoriko" has a progressive structure that builds for over two minutes before reaching the song's chorus. The band took elements from their previous compositions for the song, in order to create something that would express Sakanaction's entire story to their newly found audience. Critics in Japan responded very positively to the song, believing it showed off an essential identity and style of Sakanaction's music.

Commercially, the song reached number five on Oricon's singles chart, and was certified gold by the Recording Industry Association of Japan for non-cellphone digital downloads.

== Background and development ==
In September 2011, Sakanaction released their fifth studio album Documentaly, which had reached number two on the Japanese Oricon albums chart; the highest position achieved by the band in their career at the time. The album was strongly affected by the events of the 2011 Tōhoku earthquake and tsunami which had occurred in March of that year, during the promotional period for their single "Rookie". The band's vocalist and songwriter Ichiro Yamaguchi felt a new resolution to create music that would resonate with a general pop music audience, who listened to idol acts such as Girls' Generation and AKB48. As rock music was no longer a popular staple during the early 2010s in Japan, Yamaguchi felt that the reasons people listened to music had changed over time, and wanted to mix rock music with entertainment-focused music in order to give these people the type of music that they look for.

The band were contacted by the promotions team of Mode Gakuen to write a commercial song for their 2012 advertisements in October, when the band had just begun performing their Sakanaquarium 2011 tour for Documentaly. This was the first time the band had been asked to write a piece of music specifically for a purpose (though songs on Documentaly had been used for commercial tie-ups, these had been organized after the songs had been completed). The band recorded the song after the tour finished, and planned to release it as a single at the beginning of 2012. However, while this was happening, the band were contacted to write a theme song for the Tsuyoshi Kusanagi drama 37-sai de Isha ni Natta Boku: Kenshui Junjō Monogatari, which disrupted their plans for the single. The theme song, "Boku to Hana", was released in May 2012.

In 2012, Yamaguchi was commissioned to write the song "Moment" for the Japanese boy band SMAP. Used as the theme music for the Tokyo Broadcasting System Television broadcast of the 2012 Summer Olympics, for which SMAP member Masahiro Nakai was the main sportscaster, the song was released as a single on August 1, 2012, and reached number one on Oricon's weekly singles chart.

== Writing and inspiration ==
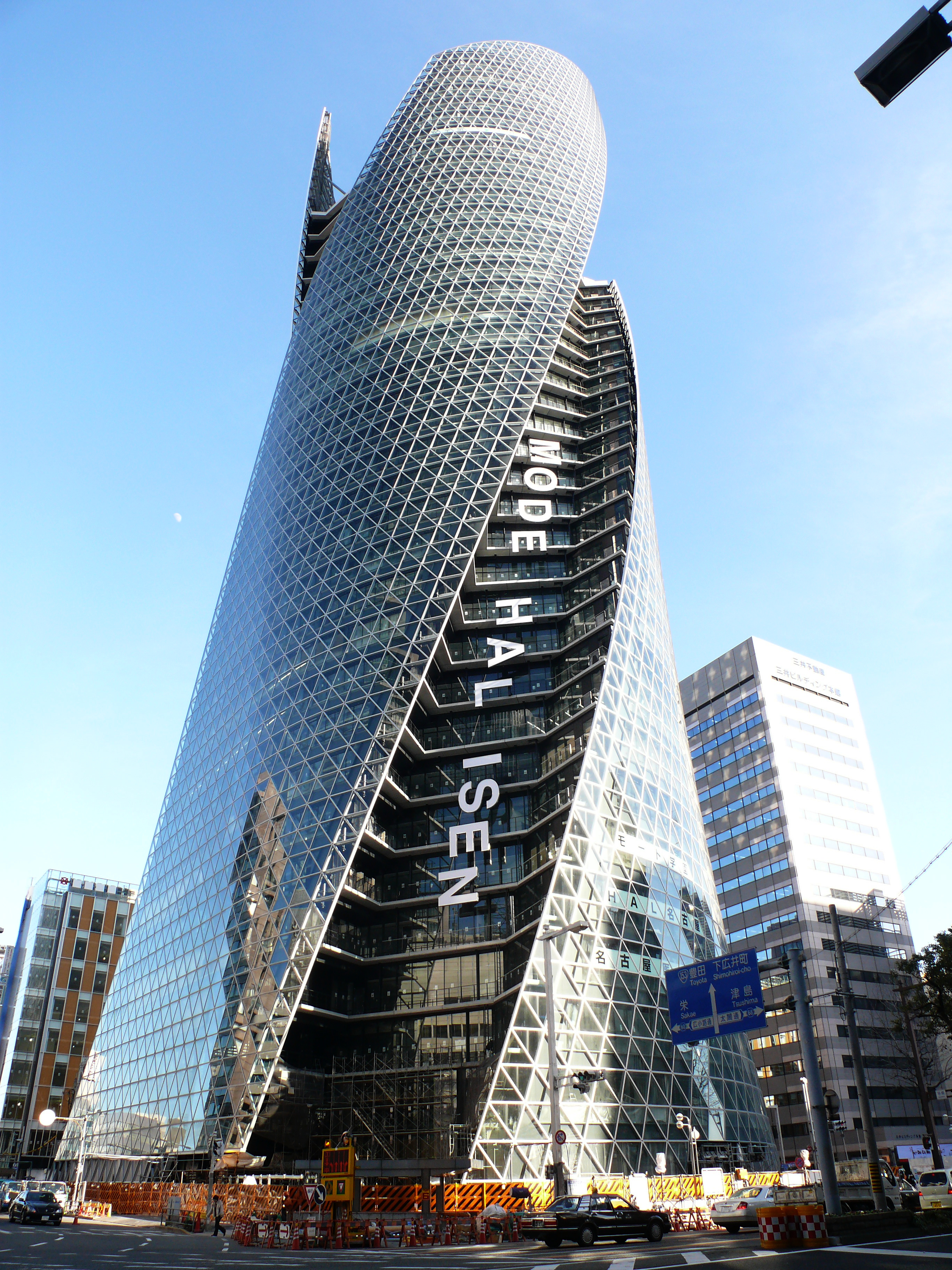
"Yoru no Odoriko" was commissioned for commercials for the design school Mode Gakuen (pictured: Mode Gakuen's Nagoya campus).

The songs for the single were recorded at Alive Recording Studio in Setagaya, Tokyo and at Soi Studio. In the initial discussions with Mode Gakuen about the commercial, the company revealed to Sakanaction that they would be writing music for a "sparkling" commercial featuring choreographer Jonte' Moaning, and requested that they give them a song similar to "Native Dancer" (2009) or "Identity" (2010). The band chose a piece from Yamaguchi's pre-existing stock of songs, selecting a song that would best suit the commercial. As Mode Gakuen is a design school, they were asked to create a song that showed off design principles and creativity, as well as the commercial's theme of the importance of improving yourself. Yamaguchi felt that these needs worked well with Sakanaction's own goals for 2012.

As the band had just finished touring, Sakanaction were inspired by the creation of their tour set-list. The band wanted to create a song that expressed their entire story, purposely taking elements from songs that they felt were important to Sakanaction, such as "Identity" (2010), "Native Dancer" (2009) and "Adventure" (2009). The band gave the song the demo title "Yellow" (イエロー, Ierō), later creating a title that incorporated the word "Yoru" (夜; "Night"). This was a method to link to the band's other releases, which since their debut had had a night-time theme, for their newer audience.

Yamaguchi felt that "Yoru no Odoriko" was a song targeted towards Sakanaction fans, as opposed to their previous song "Boku to Hana", which specifically for a wider TV audience.

== Composition ==
"Yoru no Odoriko"
Critics felt that "Yoru no Odoriko"'s sound expressed an essential style of Sakanaction.

"Yoru no Odoriko" is a high tempo song with a four on the floor beat, with elements of dance music, pop music and rock. The song begins with a section mixing "light" synthesizer sounds and feminine backing vocals, on top of a bass drum rhythm. This section builds for two minutes and twenty seconds before reaching the chorus.

== Promotion and release ==
Commercials for the design school Mode Gakuen featuring "Yoru no Odoriko" and choreographer Jonte' Moaning began airing in April 2012. The band performed the song for the first time at their two performances at Zepp Tokyo on June 18 and 19, after which they returned to the studio to continue recording for the single. On August 1, a paid ringtone version of the single was released. Yamaguchi wanted to stress the importance of listeners being "surprised and delighted" by the entire song on the single's release day, so the band only released the section that had been used in the Mode Gakuen commercial as a ringtone. The band debuted the song on Japanese radio only two days before the single's release date.

The single was released with two B-sides: "Multiple Exposure" and "Boku to Hana (Sakanaction Remix)". "Multiple Exposure" is an original song written with a chill-out style, which Yamaguchi wrote to counter the band's most recent songs, the wide audience-focused "Boku to Hana", "Moment" and "Yoru no Odoriko". An inner focused song, "Multiple Exposure" was created by the band trusted their initial, naturally occurring feelings, showing off to the band newer audience what they wanted to do musically. Yamaguchi thought that his lyrics would be difficult for people to interpret, however felt that they were right for the song as they were how Yamaguchi thought naturally. The lyrics contrasted with the "juvenile" lyrical impression of "Yoru no Odoriko", and were written as a realistic discussion of modern society. The second song, "Boku to Hana (Sakanaction Remix)", was the first time the band had released a remix that they had produced themselves. As the song was produced for the drama 37-sai de Isha ni Natta Boku: Kenshui Junjō Monogatari (2012), the remix of the song was how the band would have performed "Boku to Hana" if it had not needed to be a pop song intended for a wide audience of drama viewers. Primarily made by bassist Ami Kusakari and drummer Keiichi Ejima without any input by Yamaguchi, the remix was a version of the song that replaced the song's pop sound with a more club-oriented dance sound. Two versions of the physical single were released: a CD only edition and a CD/DVD edition. The DVD featured material recorded in binaural audio at the pre-show performance of their June 19, 2012 performance at Zepp Tokyo.

On August 31, the band performed the song on the TV Asahi television program Music Station, their second appearance on the program after performing "Bach no Senritsu o Yoru ni Kiita Sei Desu" a year prior. The band performed "Yoru no Odoriko" at their summer festival performances, such as Join Alive, the Fuji Rock Festival and Sweet Love Shower. Three live performances of the song have been released by Sakanaction. The first was the performance from the band's pre-show recording of their Zepp Tokyo performance featured on the single's DVD, and additional performances of the song were featured on the band's Sakanaquarium 2013 Sakanaction: Live at Makuhari Messe 2013.5.19 video album, and their Sakanatribe 2014: Live at Tokyo Dome City Hall video album.

"Yoru no Odoriko" was remixed for inclusion on the band's 2015 compilation album Natsukashii Tsuki wa Atarashii Tsuki: Coupling & Remix Works by electronic musician Agraph. The album also compiled "Multiple Exposure", however did not feature the single's other track, "Boku to Hana (Sakanaction Remix)".

== Cover artwork ==
The single's cover artwork was designed by Kamikene of the design team Hatos. It features five characters taken from a line of the song's lyrics overlapping in the same space: ima (今; "now"), nan (何; "what"), pun (分; "minutes"), go (後; "after") and the possessive particle no (の). The first press edition of the single features a screen of vertical lines, which can display each individual letter as the artwork is moved behind it. Kamikene was inspired to use this lyrical phrase as the basis for the cover because he believed that it expressed the song's "danceable sound and fresh lyrics", and was a connection to the band's recurring theme of night. Sakanaction wanted to have a cover artwork that needed to be experienced by having a physical copy, to emphasize the music listening experience that the band members had in the 1990s that was increasingly becoming rare as music was released digitally.

== Music video ==
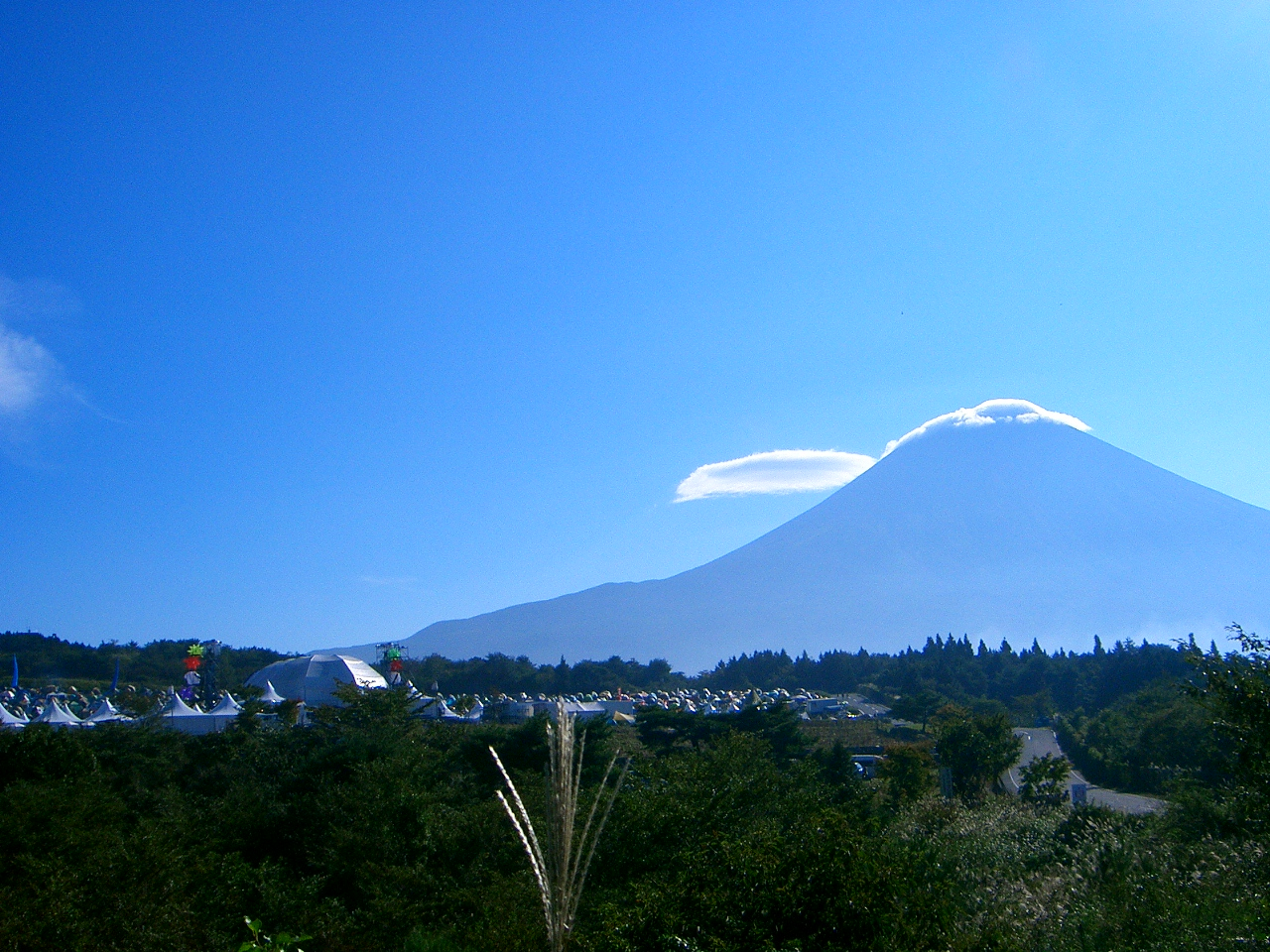
The music video features the band performing in a field against a summer view of Mount Fuji (pictured).

The music video was directed by Yūsuke Tanaka, who had previously worked together with the band in 2011 for the video for their single "Bach no Senritsu o Yoru ni Kiita Sei Desu". A trailer for the music video was released on August 23, and the video was unveiled in full on August 28.

The music video features the members of Sakanaction in traditional Japanese clothing and gaudy make-up, at the foot of Mount Fuji alongside two traditional Japanese dancers. The video is composed of several scenes where the camera's distance grows closer to the performers, showing scenes sequentially closer in time to the beat of the song. While some of these takes were shot in daylight, others were taken in darkness, while the band or Yamaguchi were lit by colored lights. In the latter part of the video, it is revealed that the view of the band is from the perspective of a high school girl (played by actress and model Yui Miura), who wears binoculars to view the band. The camera then focuses on the girl using the same technique that the band was shot in. The girl finds Yamaguchi performing the song directly in front of her, and finally decides to run away.

Tanaka was asked to center the video around shots of the band performing the song, something the band had not done since their 2010 single "Identity". Inspired by the song title's association with the 1926 short story "The Dancing Girl of Izu", Tanaka created the idea of the band members acting as traveling performers, dressed in kimono and decorated with striking make-up. Tanaka was inspired by the 1980s make-up styles of musicians such as Kenji Sawada and Kiyoshiro Imawano, however with an exaggerated "crumbled" look, to emulate the look of an unbathed and well-traveled performer. Creative director Hisashi "Momo" Kitazawa showed the video's make-up artist Shinji Konishi a picture from artist Pater Sato's early 1980s works to inspire Konishi. Kitazawa felt that a lot of emphasis had to be put onto the band's visual look, as this would have formed the entire basis of the video if Mount Fuji had been particularly foggy on the day that the band shot the video.

Tanaka felt that the rhythmically closer camera view technique would feel gimmicky just by itself, which is why he introduced the high school girl as a secondary character whose perspective the camera is seeing. By placing a school girl into the video, Tanaka felt that this established that the video was shot in the present, emphasizing the oddness of the performance troupe Sakanaction play.

== Reception ==
=== Critical reception ===
Music critics in Japan responded positively to "Yoru no Odoriko", with both CDJournal reviewers and music reviewer Tetsuo Hiraga writing for Billboard Japan feeling that the song expressed an essential, core identity and style of Sakanaction. CDJournal reviewers praised the first verse's "detached synths and a simple four-on-the-floor rhythm" mixed with an "unconcerned melody with a trance-like backing". They felt that as the song progressed through its "trance-like" structure which gave a sense of being on a dance floor, it gradually built up to an emotionally satisfying chorus. They further praised Yamaguchi's "human" vocals, feeling the techniques he used showed a J-Pop style to them, and the song's "catchy melody". Hiraga called the song a further re-imagination of the band's dance music sound, praising the song's "fresh lyrics and melody". Hanako Fujita of Rockin' On Japan felt similarly about the song's "literary" lyrics and sound, believing that the song's progression showed off Sakanaction's "musical charm". She thought of the song's lyrical message as being very effective, and believed that listeners could happily let the song take over themselves because of its "vivid and steady world of sound".

=== Commercial reception ===
In it first week, "Yoru no Odoriko" reached number five on Oricon's top 200 singles chart, selling 31,000 physical copies (approximately the same number that rival sales tracking agency SoundScan Japan noted). The single quickly fell out of the top ten, falling to number 19 in its second week, and spent five further weeks in the top 100 singles. In total, the single spent a total of ten weeks in the top 200 singles. Seven month after its release, the song was certified gold by the Recording Industry Association of Japan for more than 100,000 paid downloads (excluding cellphone downloads).

=== Internet meme ===
In 2026, the song became a part of a viral meme. The song was played over a video with an Indonesian boy with sunglasses standing on the front of a boat. Many short-length videos on social networking platforms featured participants mimicking both the boy and the rowers behind him. The meme has been re-created by various Japanese and Korean artists and idols further adding to its popularity, and eventually even by Yamaguchi himself.

Due to its resurgent popularity, the song re-entered music charts 14 years after its initial release, hitting number one on the Oricon streaming rankings for three consecutive weeks, as well as reaching 1st place on Spotify Japan's rankings in May 2026. The song was subsequently also nominated for "Best Revival Hit Song" at Music Awards Japan 2026.

== Track listing ==
All tracks are written by Ichiro Yamaguchi.

No.	Title	Length
1.	"Yoru no Odoriko"	5:06
2.	"Multiple Exposure"	5:21
3.	"Boku to Hana (Sakanaction Remix)" (僕と花, "The Flower and I")	6:44
Total length:		17:11

DVD: Sakanaquarium 2012: Zepp Alive Alone
No.	Title	Length
1.	"Boku to Hana (Sakanaquarium 2012: Zepp Alive Alone)"
2.	"Boku to Hana (Sakanaction Remix) (Sakanaquarium 2012: Zepp Alive Alone)"
3.	"Native Dancer (Sakanaquarium 2012: Zepp Alive Alone)" (ネイティブダンサー Neitivu Dansā)
4.	"Identity (Sakanaquarium 2012: Zepp Alive Alone)" (アイデンティティ Aidentiti)
5.	"Rookie (Sakanaquarium 2012: Zepp Alive Alone)" (ルーキー Rūkī)
6.	"Yoru no Odoriko (Sakanaquarium 2012: Zepp Alive Alone)"

== Personnel ==
Personnel details were sourced from Sakanaction's liner notes booklet, as well as the liner notes included in the "Yoru no Odoriko" single.

Sakanaction

- All members – arrangement, production
- Keiichi Ejima – drums
- Motoharu Iwadera – guitar
- Ami Kusakari – bass guitar
- Emi Okazaki – keyboards
- Ichiro Yamaguchi – vocals, guitar, lyrics, composition

Personnel and imagery

- Minoru Iwabuchi – executive producer
- Kamikene – art direction, design
- Kotaro Kojima – mastering ("Yoru no Odoriko" single)
- Kensuke Maeda – assistant engineer
- Tatsuya Nomura – executive producer (Hip Land Music Corporation)
- Yoriko Sugimoto – A&R director
- Satoshi Tajima – executive producer
- Naoki Toyoshima – executive producer
- Masashi Uramoto – mixing, recording
- Satoshi Yamagami – A&R promoter
- Naoki Yokota – executive producer

Music video

- Aoi Pro – production
- Rien Fujikage – dancer
- Kai Hananomoto – choreographer
- Rin Hanayagi – dancer
- Akira Hosoka – producer
- Hisashi "Momo" Kitazawa – creative director, stylist
- Shinji Konishi – hair, make-up
- Takehiko Mori – art
- Kento Shimizu – production manager
- Reiko Shimizu – dressing
- Minako Suzuki – hair, make-up
- Sen Takeuchi – production manager
- Yūsuke Tanaka – director
- Shoji Uchida – camera
- Akifumi Yone'i – lighting

== Charts ==
Chart (2012)	Peak position
Japan Billboard Adult Contemporary Airplay	1
Japan Billboard Japan Hot 100	2
Japan Oricon weekly singles	5

Chart (2026)	Peak position
Global Excl. US (Billboard)	188
Japan Billboard Japan Hot 100	2
Japan Billboard weekly streaming	1
Japan Oricon weekly streaming	1
Japan Spotify	1
Japan Apple Music	1

== Certifications and sales ==
Region	Certification	Certified units/sales
Japan (Oricon) Physical	—	48,000
Japan (RIAJ) Digital	Platinum	250,000^{*}
Streaming
Japan (RIAJ)	Platinum	100,000,000^{†}
^{*} Sales figures based on certification alone.^{†} Streaming-only figures based on certification alone.

== Release history ==
Region	Date	Format	Distributing Label	Catalog codes
Japan	August 1, 2012	Ringtone	Victor Entertainment	—N/a
Japan	August 27, 2012	Radio add date	Victor Entertainment	—N/a
Japan	August 29, 2012	CD single, CD/DVD single, digital download	Victor Entertainment	VICL-36718, VIZL-488
Japan	September 15, 2012	Rental CD single	Victor Entertainment	VICL-36718
South Korea	October 4, 2012	Digital download	J-Box Entertainment	—N/a
