= Boku to Hana =

- Physical and digital EP editions' cover

Single by Sakanaction

from the album Sakanaction
- Released: May 15, 2012
- Recorded: 2012
- Genre: Pop, electro, rock
- Length: 3:53
- Label: Victor Entertainment
- Songwriter: Ichiro Yamaguchi
- Producer: Sakanaction

Sakanaction singles chronology
"Bach no Senritsu o Yoru ni Kiita Sei Desu" (2011)	"Boku to Hana" (2012)	"Yoru no Odoriko" (2012)

"Boku to Hana" (Japanese: 僕と花; "The Flower and I") (Japanese pronunciation: [boꜜkɯ to hanaꜜ]) is a song by Japanese band Sakanaction. The theme song for the Tsuyoshi Kusanagi-starring medical drama 37-sai de Isha ni Natta Boku: Kenshui Junjō Monogatari, it was released as a single by the band in May 2012, the first from their sixth album Sakanaction.

The band created the song in a planned and structured manner, considering how it would be received by both Sakanaction's fan-base and the drama audience. The medium tempo pop song was praised by critics for its minimalist and nostalgic feel, as well as its emotive lyrics. Commercially, the song performed well, being certified gold by the Recording Industry Association of Japan three months after its release. The song's music video was recorded live in a single take, featuring Yamaguchi as a "delicate-hearted" protagonist dancing with choreographer Yoko Honaga playing a flower spirit. The performance was broadcast during a Ustream broadcast organized by the band.

== Background and development ==
In September 2011, Sakanaction released their fifth studio album Documentaly, which had reached number two on the Japanese Oricon albums chart; the highest position achieved by the band in their career at the time. The album was strongly affected by the events of the 2011 Tōhoku earthquake and tsunami which had occurred in March of that year, during the promotional period for their single "Rookie". The band's vocalist and songwriter Ichiro Yamaguchi felt a new resolution to create music that would resonate with a general pop music audience, who listened to idol acts such as Girls' Generation and AKB48. As rock music was no longer a popular staple during the early 2010s in Japan, Yamaguchi felt that the reasons people listened to music had changed over time, and wanted to mix rock music with entertainment-focused music in order to give these people the type of music that they look for.

While the band were in the middle of performing their Sakanaquarium 2011 tour for Documentaly, in October and November, the band were contacted to write the theme song for the Tsuyoshi Kusanagi drama 37-sai de Isha ni Natta Boku: Kenshui Junjō Monogatari. The band accepted the offer due to Yamaguchi's search to find new techniques for the band to reach a wider audience, finding that the aesthetics focus of 1990s and 2000s rock bands was not working as it had done in the past. Despite having just completed Documentaly several months before, Yamaguchi's new-found resolution as a musician had left him feeling refreshed, unlike Yamaguchi's feelings after completing their previous effort Kikuuiki (2010), which left him feeling drained. Agreeing to the drama theme song offer was less a sales tactic to Yamaguchi than a creative decision, as he wanted to challenge the band to create a song that would link together the two audiences who would hear the song: Sakanaction's fanbase and the drama viewers who had not previously heard their music.

When they received the offer, the band had been working on "Yoru no Odoriko" (2012), a song commissioned to appear in commercials for the design vocational school Mode Gakuen. They decided to shelve their plans to release "Yoru no Odoriko" as their next single, in favor of the drama theme song. After the writing and discussion process was finished, pre-production for the song began in mid-February, and recording was completed in March 2012, approximately a month before the drama would begin to air.

The drama team explained the premise to the drama, and Yamaguchi read the scripts for the first two episodes. Originally, the drama team requested an uplifting song that expressed the idea that a person can start their life again at any point. The team suggested the band create an up-tempo dance/rock song in the vein of "Adventure" from Shin-shiro (2009), "Aruku Around" (2010) or "Identity" (2010), but after familiarizing himself with the story, Yamaguchi worried that a composition similar to those songs would not suit the drama well. He suggested to the drama team that a song in a similar style to "Yoru no Higashigawa" from Go to the Future (2007) or "Word" (2007) would suit the drama better, to which they agreed.

On March 28, the band released a video album for their October and November 2011 tour, Sakanaquarium 2011 Documentaly: Live at Makuhari Messe. Two days later, the band officially announced the "Boku to Hana" single, as well as its status as the theme song of 37-sai de Isha ni Natta Boku: Kenshui Junjō Monogatari.

== Writing and inspiration ==
As this was the first time for Yamaguchi to write a theme song for a drama, he felt pressure to not make something unexpected for the first time. The song needed to work conceptually different to their other compositions, as the drama would utilize only a shortened version of the song, and the lyrics needed to reinforce the themes and messages of the drama. At the same time, the band felt that they needed to balance this with the needs of Sakanaction as a band, by creating a song that would express what kind of band Sakanaction are to a different audience than their usual one. Because of this, "Boku to Hana" felt very planned to the band members, reminiscent of the painstaking and methodical method the band used while recording their first two albums, Go to the Future and Night Fishing. These deliberate techniques meant that the band considered how each section of the song would be received by the two audiences, and plotted the lengths of each section of the song. Sakanaction followed the conventions that they saw in Japanese songs used for music featured on television programs, to create something that would be easily received by a mainstream "majority" Japanese audience. These recording sessions were the first in the band's career where they had recorded the music in its entirety first, without having lyrics to accompany it.

Yamaguchi felt that the song did not have a clear chorus, unlike their previous singles. The band's pianist Emi Okazaki felt that the melody needed to be "colored" with synthesizer sounds for the melody to be expressed in the most effective way. In order to do this, Okazaki took the grand piano piano settings that she had used for the band's live performances of "Years" on her Fantom-G keyboard, and edited them to create a more night-like quality. Okazaki also used Fantom-G keyboard's pipe organ sound suite, the second time she had done this after "Bach no Senritsu o Yoru ni Kiita Sei Desu" (2011). Originally she intended to perform this section on a real pipe organ, but found that the Fantom-G's rotary effect suited the song better. While creating the song, Yamaguchi tried to stress nostalgia when creating the song, and wrote the song around everyday feelings.

Yamaguchi considered two different viewpoints when writing the song's lyrics: that of the drama's protagonist Yūta Konno, and Yamaguchi's own real-life experience of attempting something new, as he had never written a drama theme song before. At first, Yamaguchi wrote lyrics describing the drama from a prequel-like perspective, but these were too dark and painful. After re-writing the lyrics many times, Yamaguchi changed the song's perspective to be from after the events of the drama. He felt that this was a technique that would resonate with listeners, as they realized what specific lyrics referred to as the drama progressed. When Yamaguchi submitted the final lyrics to the drama team, they reacted mostly positively, however asked for the final line of the song to be altered to incorporate the idea of 'taking first steps'. It was the first experience for Yamaguchi to have someone telling him to alter his lyrics, however he did not object to the request, as he felt that "Boku to Hana" was a composition that would not have existed if not for the drama.

== Composition ==
"Boku to Hana"
The minimalist and "nostalgic" sound of "Boku to Hana" was praised by critics.

"Boku to Hana" is a medium tempo pop song, performed with rock instruments sound that incorporates electronic elements. The song features prominent grand piano-style synthesizers, created on a Roland Fantom-G synthesizer. The rotary effect Roland Fantom-G was utilized in the latter half of the song to create a pipe organ sound effect.

== Promotion and release ==
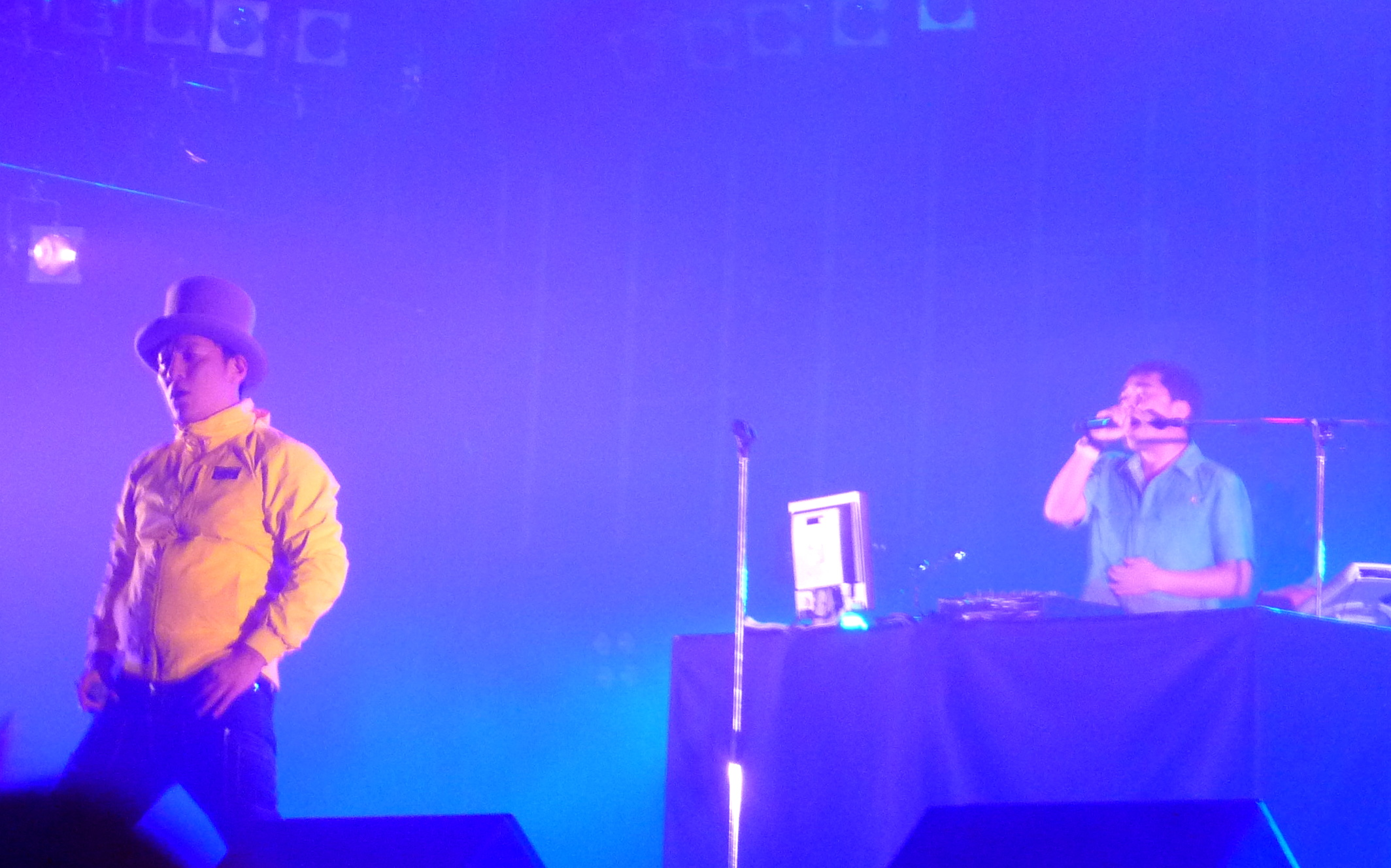
Takkyu Ishino (right) of the band Denki Groove remixed Sakanaction's song "Rookie" for inclusion on the "Boku to Hana" single.

The single's announcement was less than two weeks before the first episode of 37-sai de Isha ni Natta Boku: Kenshui Junjō Monogatari aired on April 10. The song was debuted on the Tokyo FM radio program School of Lock! on April 25, On May 2, Sakanaction held a special live streaming event on the video service Ustream, where they recorded the song's music video live.

"Boku to Hana" was released as a single track digital download on May 15, 2012, followed by a full-length three song CD single on May 30. The single featured two B-sides: an original composition entitled "Neptunus", and a remix of the band's single "Rookie" by Japanese DJ Takkyu Ishino of Denki Groove. "Neptunus" was written in the same lyrical world view as "Boku to Hana", as the band had done on their previous single "Bach no Senritsu o Yoru ni Kiita Sei Desu" with its B-side "Years". The band created the song instinctively, as opposed to the planned style that "Boku to Hana" was written in. The "colorful and psychedelic" song was written as a metaphor for the objects and atmosphere Yamaguchi felt in his room at home, a technique Yamaguchi had previously used on the song "Coelacanth to Boku" on Kikuuiki (2010). The band created the basic song arrangement while improvising in studio recording sessions. The band decided to include a remix by Ishino after considering what sort of music would be the best for the people who grew to know "Boku to Hana" because of its use as a drama theme song. Working with Ishino had been discussed with the band's staff many times, but the opportunity only really presented itself after the band met Denki Groove backstage at the Rising Sun Rock Festival in 2011. Sakanaction chose "Rookie" as the song to be remixed by Ishino, but gave Ishino free rein as to the content and style of his version.

In May and June 2012 the band went on tour, performing at Zepp concert halls in six cities across Japan. The band performed "Boku to Hana" at these concerts, along with a remix of the song produced by the band members. This remix was compiled onto the band's following single "Yoru no Odoriko", and video footage from the songs being performed before the audience arrived was included onto the CD/DVD edition of the single. The concert, Sakanaquarium 2012: Zepp Alive, was released as a live album on November 14, 2012, featuring performances of both "Boku to Hana" and its remix. The remix was created to be how the band would have performed "Boku to Hana" if it had not needed to be a pop song intended for a wide audience of drama viewers. Primarily made by bassist Ami Kusakari and drummer Keiichi Ejima without any input by Yamaguchi, the remix was a version of the song that replaced the song's pop sound with a more club-oriented dance sound.

During album promotions for the band's studio album Sakanaction, the group performed the song in a duet with the Japanese boyband SMAP on their variety show SMAP×SMAP on March 18, 2013. The song was performed during the band's Sakanaquarium 2013 tour, and a recording of this was featured on their Sakanaquarium 2013 Sakanaction: Live at Makuhari Messe 2013.5.19 video album.

In 2015, the single's two B-sides "Neptunus" and "Rookie (Takkyu Ishino Remix)" were on the band's compilation album Natsukashii Tsuki wa Atarashii Tsuki: Coupling & Remix Works.

== Cover artwork ==
As with the band's previous releases, the cover artwork was created by the design team Hatos. It depicts a television programming guide listing 37-sai de Isha ni Natta Boku: Kenshui Junjō Monogatari, on top of which stands drawn characters, who represent the band members of Sakanaction. Hatos' designer Kamikene was inspired to create the artwork by considering Sakanaction writing a television drama theme song as a challenge for them to enter mainstream media. Much like the cover artworks for the band's singles from Documentaly, the preceding digital download edition of "Boku to Hana" featured an alternative cover artwork. This artwork was identical to the standard edition, except for the television guide colored bright blue.

== Music video ==
The music video was directed by Yasuyuki Yamaguchi, who had previously worked with Sakanaction in 2011 for the music video for "Document", a video created for inclusion in Sakanaction's DVD Sakanarchive 2007—2011: Sakanaction Music Video Collection. It was recorded in a single take on May 2, 2012, during a live broadcast on the live video streaming service Ustream, and released later as a music video on YouTube on May 18, 2012. The idea to record the music video live stemmed from an idea to create a music video in the style of a stage play. As Yamaguchi had had a lot of experience using Ustream as a medium (beginning with Sakanaction utilizing Ustream services in March 2010, when the release party for their album Kikuuiki (2010) was broadcast live, and Yamaguchi's series of videos created together with musician and actor Gen Hoshino, Sake no Sakana, which first aired on March 30, 2011.), the two ideas merged to create a live music video project.

Originally the video was planned to feature the story of a delicate-hearted protagonist, played by Yamaguchi, who is put into a glass case while evil and hypocritical events happened in the world outside the case. After discussions with the band, the plan for the video changed: the protagonist was kept, and instead the video featured a story where the protagonist was hurt by different characters and by society, culminating in a scene where he lost something important to him. The video was recorded like a theatrical play, and incorporated optical illusions created by stage techniques.

The video begins with the protagonist sitting alone in a room, while a "flower spirit", played by dancer and choreographer Yoko Honaga, dances around him. Yamaguchi picks up a pot plant and moves in an anti-clockwise circle. As he moves, the protagonist encounters obstacles he tries to save the pot plant, such as dancers dressed as train commuters, or the flower being blown away. Occasionally the protagonist returns to his room, where the other members of Sakanaction are performing the song in beige clothing. At the end of the video, dancers steal the pot plant and cut off its leaves and flower. The protagonist crumples to the floor as the lotus flower dancer stands next to him, and he frantically runs away. The final scene shows the protagonist looking at the stand where the pot plant used to be.

== Reception ==
=== Critical reception ===
Tetsuo Hiraga of Hot Express praised the song for its "understandable emotion and startlingly explosive sound". He believed that the song strongly expressed a message to start life again, after a long period in grief. Tomoyuki Mori of Hot Express described the song's melody as "nostalgic", and felt that the song's lyrics were a crossroads between loss and hope. CDJournal reviewers focused on the song's arrangement, feeling that the song "shines with a feel-good tight groove", praising the "Sakanaction-like electro sound stripped down to the essence" and the song's full use of Yamaguchi's vocals and Kusakari's "groovy bass".

Hiroki Tokuyama of Rockin' On Japan felt that the band had crafted a high level of entertaining aspects into the song, in a way that only the band could do. He felt that for a theme song for a medical drama, the lyric "boku no me hitotsu agemashō, dakara anata no me o kudasai" (僕の目 ひとつあげましょう だからあなたの目をください; "I'll give you one of my eyes, so please give me yours") was particularly striking and something that other bands would not do.

=== Commercial reception ===
The single reached number six on Oricon's singles chart after 18,000 copies were tracked as sold, while rival sales tracking agency SoundScan Japan tracked 16,000 physical copies sold in the same period. The single spent a total of seven weeks in the top 200, selling a total of 26,000 copies. The song performed well digitally, peaking at number 13 on the RIAJ Digital Track Chart for two weeks. This made "Boku to Hana" the band's most successful song on the chart to date, beating out "Aruku Around" (2010) and "Bach no Senritsu o Yoru ni Kiita Sei Desu"'s (2011) positions of 38 and 30 respectively. After three months, the song was certified gold by the Recording Industry Association of Japan, for 100,000 PC digital downloads.

== Track listings ==
Digital download
No.	Title	Length
1.	"Boku to Hana"	3:53
Total length:		3:53

All tracks are written by Ichiro Yamaguchi.

CD single and digital EP
No.	Title	Length
1.	"Boku to Hana"	3:53
2.	"Neptunus" (ネプトゥーヌス Neputūnusu)	6:02
3.	"Rookie (Takkyu Ishino Remix)" (ルーキー Rūkī)	6:45
Total length:		16:40

== Personnel ==
Personnel details were sourced from Sakanaction's liner notes booklet.

Sakanaction

- All members – arrangement, production
- Keiichi Ejima – drums
- Motoharu Iwadera – guitar
- Ami Kusakari – bass guitar
- Emi Okazaki – keyboards
- Ichiro Yamaguchi – vocals, guitar, lyrics, composition

Personnel and imagery

- Minoru Iwabuchi – executive producer
- Kensuke Maeda – assistant engineer
- Tatsuya Nomura – executive producer (Hip Land Music Corporation)
- Tadashi Owaki – assistant engineer
- Yoriko Sugimoto – A&R director
- Satoshi Tajima – executive producer
- Ayaka Toki – assistant engineer
- Naoki Toyoshima – executive producer
- Masashi Uramoto – mixing, recording
- Satoshi Yamagami – A&R promoter
- Naoki Yokota – executive producer

Music video

- Tadashi Baba – art
- Shintaro Ehara – camera
- Yuka Esumi – dancer
- Shūhei Fuchino – dancer
- Yoko Honaga – choreographer, dancer
- Yuya Igarashi – dancer
- Yoshinori Ikeda – dancer
- Shintaro Kanamaru – dancer
- Saki Kato – dancer
- Hisashi "Momo" Kitazawa – stylist
- Misato Mochizuki – dancer
- Mu-cho – dancer
- Mao Nakagawa – dancer
- Asami Nemoto – hair, make-up
- Hideyuki Nomura – producer
- OMB – production company
- Erika Sugiyama – dancer
- Masatoshi Takizawa – production manager
- Kae Touyama – dancer
- Ryōhei Watanabe – lighting
- Yasuyuki Yamaguchi – director

== Charts ==
Chart (2012)	Peak position
Japan Billboard Adult Contemporary Airplay	6
Japan Billboard Japan Hot 100	3
Japan Oricon weekly singles	6
Japan RIAJ Digital Track Chart	13

== Certification and sales ==
Region	Certification	Certified units/sales
Japan (Oricon) (physical single sales)	—	26,000
Japan (RIAJ) (PC downloads)	Gold	100,000^{*}
^{*} Sales figures based on certification alone.

== Release history ==
Region	Date	Format	Distributing Label	Catalog codes
Japan	April 10, 2012	ringtone	Victor Entertainment	—N/a
Japan	April 25, 2012	radio add date	Victor Entertainment	—N/a
Japan	May 15, 2012	digital download	Victor Entertainment	—N/a
Japan	May 30, 2012	CD single	Victor Entertainment	VICL-36705
Japan	June 16, 2012	rental CD single	Victor Entertainment	VICL-36705
South Korea	July 4, 2012	digital download	J-Box Entertainment	—N/a
