= Moment (SMAP song) =

- Standard edition cover.

Single by SMAP
- B-side: "Te o Tsunagō", "Wow! Wow! Wow!"
- Released: August 1, 2012
- Recorded: 2012
- Genre: Pop
- Length: 4:32
- Label: Victor Entertainment
- Songwriter: Ichiro Yamaguchi

SMAP singles chronology
"Sakasama no Sora" (2012)	"Moment" (2012)	"Mistake" (2013)

"Moment" is a song by Japanese band SMAP. Released as a single on August 1, 2012, the song was used as the theme song for the Tokyo Broadcasting System Television broadcast of the 2012 Summer Olympics, for which SMAP member Masahiro Nakai was the main sportscaster. It was written by the band Sakanaction's vocalist and songwriter Ichiro Yamaguchi, while the single's B-side "Te o Tsunagō" was written by producer Kenichi Maeyamada. The single was commercially successful, reaching number one on Oricon's singles chart, and was certified gold by the Recording Industry Association of Japan.

== Background and development ==
Since 2004, SMAP songs had been used by Tokyo Broadcasting System Television to pair with their Olympic Games coverage, with "Susume!" from SMAP 016/MIJ (2004) used for the Athens 2004 Summer Olympics broadcast, and "Kono Toki, Kitto Yume ja Nai" (2008) for the Beijing 2008 Summer Olympics. The band's single "Triangle" (2006) was similarly used by TV Asahi for their broadcasts of the Torino 2006 Winter Olympics and the Vancouver 2010 Winter Olympics.

In 2010, SMAP worked together with Sakanaction member Ichiro Yamaguchi, when he created the song "Magic Time" for their album We Are SMAP!. Sakanaction's most recently released single at the time, "Boku to Hana" (2012), acted as the theme song for the drama 37-sai de Isha ni Natta Boku: Kenshui Junjō Monogatari, in which SMAP member Tsuyoshi Kusanagi starred.

A week after the single was released, the band released their 20th studio album, Gift of SMAP, despite the song not appearing on the album.

== Writing and production ==
When SMAP's production team asked Yamaguchi to create the song, he did not know if the song was going to be a single or an album song as "Magic Time" had been. Yamaguchi created the song after listening to SMAP's previous singles, attempting to create a medium tempo song that could express the fire in someone's heart. Yamaguchi felt that writing the song had been a learning process for him, as he needed to consider what type of pop music would suit the band and the song from a different perspective to how he wrote pop music for his band Sakanaction. The song's lyrics have a message of encouragement for Olympic athletes. The song is a pop song build on top of fast tempo drums and synthesized string sounds. CDJournal reviewers felt that the song was "overflowing" with a fast pace, feeling it lyrically emphasized the importance of now.

== Commercial reception ==
The single reached number one on Oricon's weekly singles chart. As this was the band's 48th single top chart in the top ten, this broke the record for a male artist to do so at the time, with SMAP beating rock band B'z record of 47 releases. The song also became the most commercially broadcast theme song for the London Olympics in Japan, surpassing Ikimono-gakari's theme song for the NHK broadcast, "Kaze ga Fuiteiru".

== Track listings ==
Standard edition
No.	Title	Writer(s)	Arrangement	Length
1.	"Moment"	Ichiro Yamaguchi	Seikō Nagaoka	4:32
2.	"Te o Tsunagō" (手を繋ごう, "Let's Hold Hands")	Kenichi Maeyamada	Shunya Shimizu	5:02
3.	"Moment (Back Track)"	Yamaguchi	Nagaoka	4:32
4.	"Te o Tsunagō (Back Track)"	Maeyamada	Shimizu	5:00
Total length:				19:09

Seven Net exclusive edition
No.	Title	Writer(s)	{{{extra_column}}}	Length
1.	"Moment"	Yamaguchi	Nagaoka	4:32
2.	"Wow! Wow! Wow!"	Kohei Tsunami	Tsunami	4:19
3.	"Moment (Back Track)"	Yamaguchi	Nagaoka	4:32
4.	"Wow! Wow! Wow! (Back Track)"	Tsunami	Tsunami	4:19
Total length:				17:42

DVD
No.	Title	{{{extra_column}}}	Length
1.	"Moment (music video)"	4:32

== Charts ==
Chart (2012)	Peak position
Japan Billboard Adult Contemporary Airplay	1
Japan Billboard Japan Hot 100	1
Japan Oricon weekly singles	1

== Sales and certifications ==
Chart	Amount
Oricon physical sales	187,000
RIAJ physical shipping certification	Gold (100,000+)

== Release history ==
Region	Date	Format	Distributing Label	Catalogue codes
Japan	July 23, 2012	Ringtone	Victor Entertainment	—N/a
Japan	August 1, 2012	CD, CD/DVD, rental CD	Victor Entertainment	VICL-37888, VIZL-1001, SSS-002
Japan	August 15, 2012	cellphone download	Victor Entertainment	—N/a
