= Holy Dance =

Song by Sakanaction

from the album Documentaly
- Language: Japanese
- A-side: "Identity"
- Released: August 4, 2010
- Recorded: 2010
- Genre: Folk, electro
- Length: 5:17
- Label: Victor Entertainment
- Songwriter: Ichiro Yamaguchi
- Producer: Sakanaction

"Holy Dance" (Japanese: ホーリーダンス, Hepburn: Hōrī Dansu) (Japanese pronunciation: [ho:ɾi: daɰ̃sɯ]) is a song by Japanese band Sakanaction. Originally released as the B-side of the band's single "Identity" in 2010, the song was remixed for inclusion on the band's fifth album Documentaly as a bonus track. In 2015, the song became the leading track for Sakanaction's compilation album Natsukashii Tsuki wa Atarashii Tsuki: Coupling & Remix Works.

== Background and development ==
In March 2010, Sakanaction released their fourth album Kikuuiki, after which they wanted to release an "easy to digest" song in a similar vein to the album's lead single "Aruku Around". Due to Kikuuiki's success, the band felt that it was an opportune time to quickly release new material after the album. The band toured Japan in April and May, promoting Kikuuiki. During the post-album release period, the band worked on the song "Identity", which they unveiled at the end of the tour, performing it at their concert on May 28 at Zepp Tokyo and announcing the single's August release on the same day.

"Holy Dance" was recorded in June 2010, after the "Identity" single had already been announced. It was produced straight after the band had been working on "Magic Time", a composition written by band vocalist Ichiro Yamaguchi for Johnny & Associates boyband SMAP, for their album We Are SMAP! (2010).

The song was released as the second B-side of the band's "Identity" single on August 4, 2010. Conceptually, Yamaguchi thought of the single as a piece of fruit, with the lead track "Identity" acting as the skin, "Holy Dance" the flesh and the final track, "Yes No (Aoki Takamasa Remix)", as the pit.

== Writing and inspiration ==
"Holy Dance"
Music critics praised the wordplay and "exhilarating" sound of "Holy Dance".

The song was inspired by Yamaguchi's feelings he had when he wanted to go fishing, but was unable to. Yamaguchi felt that the song was produced in contrast to "Magic Time", which had been themed around love. The lyrics describe a dusk scene, of a person at a river, feeling that their pain is like a "dancing lure with a whispering laugh". They decide to throw all of their anxiety into the river, and fly into the sky. Yamaguchi felt that "Holy Dance" had become an important song for the band, and it often made the band's concert setlists.

"Holy Dance" was the only song by Sakanaction released in their career that did not feature a live bass guitar sound. Ami Kusakari instead performed synthetic bass sounds for the song. In 2011, a remix of the song was compiled on their fifth studio album Documentaly as a bonus track, "Holy Dance (Like a Live Mix)", almost identical to the original version, except for the addition of a live bass guitar to the mix.

== Promotion ==
Two live performances have been released commercially by Sakanaction. The first was on the Sakanaquarium 2011 Documentaly: Live at Makuhari Messe (2012) video album, followed by a performance on their Sakanaquarium 2013 Sakanaction: Live at Makuhari Messe 2013.5.19 video album. Though not performed at the concert, a vocal-less remix of "Holy Dance" was used for the end-roll of their performance at the Nippon Budokan on October 8, 2010 was released on DVD as Sakanaquarium (B).

As the leading promotional track from Natsukashii Tsuki wa Atarashii Tsuki: Coupling & Remix Works, the song was sent to radio stations across Japan in August 2015. In its first week of radio airplay, the song reached number 62 on the Billboard Japan Radio Songs sub-chart, and in its second week fell to number 83.

== Music video ==
"Holy Dance" was the third song to be given a music video to promote the compilation album Natsukashii Tsuki wa Atarashii Tsuki: Coupling & Remix Works. The video was released online on July 23, and was directed by Yamaguchi personally; the first time that Yamaguchi has acted as a music video director. The video features Yamaguchi facing 500 people, who are wearing headphones. Interspersed with these scenes are scenes of dancers from the dance troupe Elevenplay: first three dancers dressed in school uniforms, followed by scenes of a woman in a black dress dancing by herself. Other scenes in the video feature high speed camera footage of Yamaguchi fly fishing in a black room, and reverse footage of fishing equipment on white pedestals covered in green liquid.

Yamaguchi based the video on his hobby of fishing, and tried to create a video entirely themed around fishing. The video is inspired by the imagery that Yamaguchi had when he composed the song. He intended for the three dancers to be a metaphor for fishing lures, and for the single dancer to be a metaphor for the reel. The single dancer's actions were intended to imitate the action of casting a fishing rod. The reel used in the video is a Shimano Calcutta Conquest reel.

On June 14, Sakanaction's management group Hip Land Music posted a request asking for 500 extras for a Sakanaction music video scene. These extras shot scenes for the video in a studio in Kawaguchi, Saitama on June 18, 2015.

== Critical reception ==
Yuichi Hirayama reviewing for Excite described the song as "an electro tune demanding an escape from anguish". Later, when reviewing the song for EMTG in the context of Natsukashii Tsuki wa Atarashii Tsuki: Coupling & Remix Works (2015), felt that it had all of the "power" of "Identity" and the other band's singles. Reviewing the "Like a Live" remix found on the band's fifth album Documentaly (2011), CDJournal reviewers praised the song's "rhyme-like wordplay and exhilarating sound".

== Personnel ==
Personnel details were sourced from Natsukashii Tsuki wa Atarashii Tsuki: Coupling & Remix Works's liner notes booklet.

Personnel

- All Sakanaction members – arrangement, production
- Keiichi Ejima – drums
- Motoharu Iwadera – guitar
- Ami Kusakari – bass guitar synthesizers
- Emi Okazaki – keyboards
- Masashi Uramoto – mixing, recording
- Ichiro Yamaguchi – vocals, guitar, lyrics, composition

Music video personnel

- Kei Fujita – assistant cameraman
- Mei Hashimoto – production manager
- Nozomi Hiramoto – dancer
- Akiyoshi Irio – lighting
- Mikiko – choreographer (Elevenplay)
- Shinichi Miter – stylist
- Asami Nemoto – hair, make-up
- Hideyuki Nomura – production
- Yuka Numata – dancer
- Makoto Okuguchi – director of photography
- Taito Oyama – digital imaging technician
- Saya Shinohara – dancer
- Shin Sugawara – key grip
- Tokyo No. 1 – production company
- Emi Tsuruta – production manager
- Erisa Wakisaka – dancer
- Ichiro Yamaguchi – director
- Yasuyuki Yamaguchi – co-director, editing

== Chart rankings ==
Chart (2015)	Peak position
Japan Billboard Radio Songs	62
