= Bach no Senritsu o Yoru ni Kiita Sei Desu =

- Physical and digital EP editions' cover

Single by Sakanaction

from the album Documentaly
- Released: July 13, 2011
- Recorded: 2011
- Genre: Pop, electro, rock
- Length: 4:00
- Label: Victor Entertainment
- Songwriter: Ichiro Yamaguchi
- Producer: Sakanaction

Sakanaction singles chronology
"Rookie" (2011)	"Bach no Senritsu o Yoru ni Kiita Sei Desu" (2011)	"Boku to Hana" (2012)

"Bach no Senritsu o Yoru ni Kiita Sei Desu" (Japanese: 『バッハの旋律を夜に聴いたせいです。』, Hepburn: Bahha no Senritsu wo Yoru ni Kiita Sei Desu.; IPA: [baꜜhha no senɾitsɯ o joꜜɾɯ ɲi kiːta seꜜː desɯ̥]; "It's Because of Listening to Bach Melodies at Night") is a song by Japanese band Sakanaction. It was released as a single on July 13, 2011, one month before the band's fifth album Documentaly.

A pop and electro song inspired by the band's vocalist Ichiro Yamaguchi experience of listening to the music of German composer Johann Sebastian Bach while falling asleep, "Bach no Senritsu o Yoru ni Kiita Sei Desu" was praised by Japanese music critics for its progression, "literary" lyrics, the integration of choral vocals and four on the floor rhythm. The song's music video, featuring Yamaguchi dancing simultaneously with mannequins connected to him by metal bars was well received by critics, winning the 2012 Space Shower Music Video Awards award for the Best Video of the Year. The song was a commercial success, being certified gold by the Recording Industry Association of Japan for 100,000 paid downloads.

== Background and development ==
After the release of the band's fourth album Kikuuiki in March 2010, Sakanaction released the single "Identity" in July, followed by their first concert at the Nippon Budokan in October. Such a concert, which is often seen as an important milestone for bands, felt more like a ritual to the band's vocalist and songwriter Ichiro Yamaguchi, who was inspired to write their following single "Rookie" after the concert. During the writing process, Yamaguchi considered what direction the band should take next, what Sakanaction's place in the music scene was, and how the band was seen by others.

Just prior to "Rookie"'s planned physical release on March 16, 2011, Japan experienced the 2011 Tōhoku earthquake and tsunami on March 11, 2011. Sakanaction cancelled or rescheduled many of their scheduled radio appearances, and during their appearances preferred to focus on messages of hope for the victims of the earthquake, rather than directly promoting the single.

In June 2011, the band performed a six date tour of Japan's Zepp music halls, Sakanaquarium 2011: Zepp Alive. During these concerts, the band performed "Bach no Senritsu o Yoru ni Kiita Sei Desu" in concert for the first time.

== Writing and inspiration ==
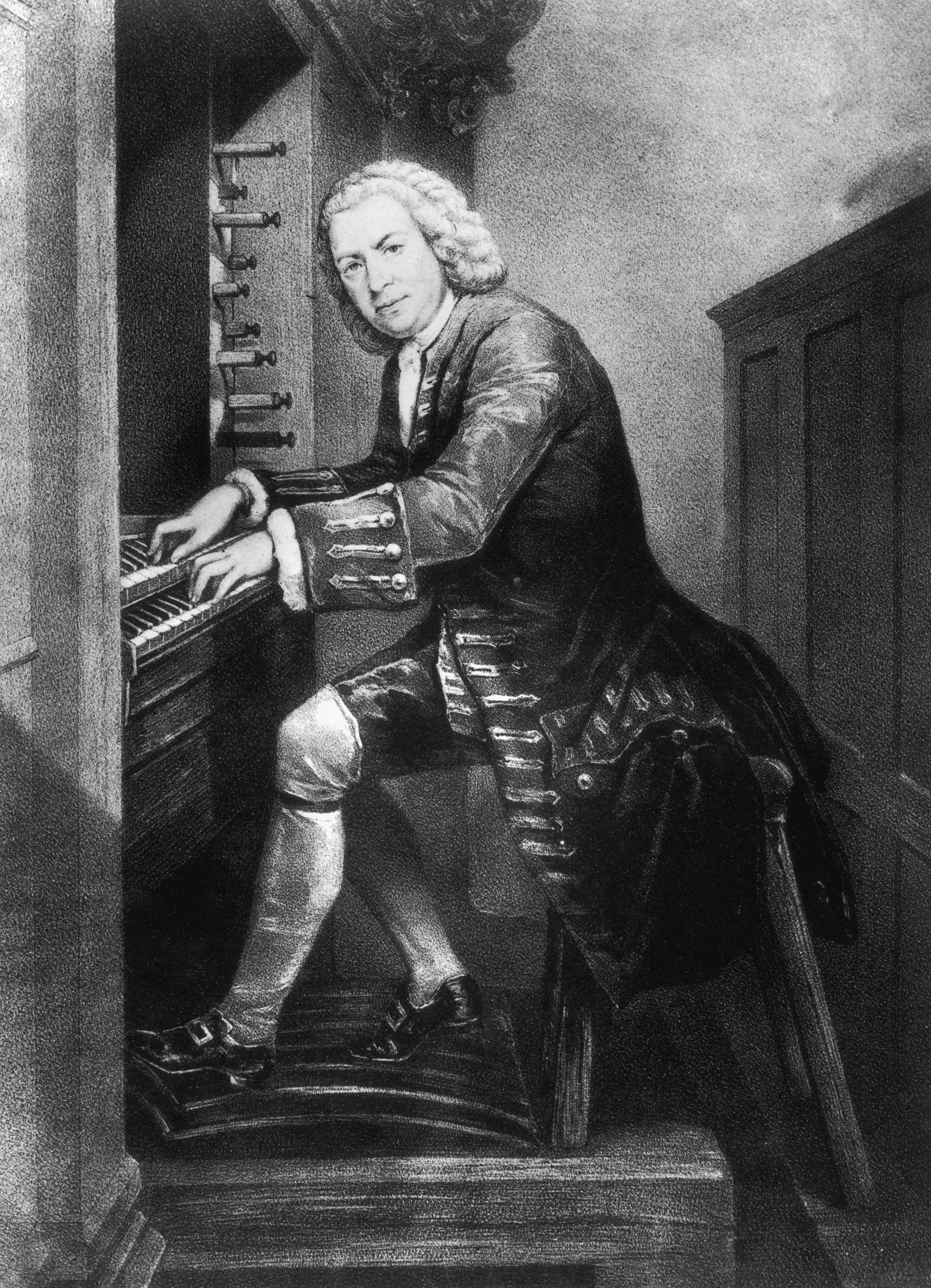
The song was inspired by feelings Ichiro Yamaguchi felt while listening to the music of German composer Johann Sebastian Bach.

Yamaguchi wrote "Bach no Senritsu o Yoru ni Kiita Sei Desu" after the events of the 2011 Tōhoku earthquake and tsunami, as therapy for himself. While the band's previous singles had been attempts to create a more popular sound, Yamaguchi always considered the tastes of the direct audience of Sakanaction. The band had always considered pop music from a rock approach, especially on their previous two singles "Identity" (2010) and "Rookie" (2011). Realizing that rock bands were no longer a staple of Japanese charts in the early 2010s, Yamaguchi wanted to create a Sakanaction-style pop song that would resonate with a general pop audience, who listened to idol groups such as Girls' Generation, TVXQ and AKB48. Of all of the songs they created in this style, Yamaguchi felt that "Bach no Senritsu o Yoru ni Kiita Sei Desu" was the one that fit with this idea the most.

While thinking of an approach that would appeal to an audience outside of rock music, and wondering about the nature of pop music, Yamaguchi thought of the music of German composer Johann Sebastian Bach as something that transcended time and genre. Yamaguchi wrote the song as a documentary of the specific feelings that he had when listening to Bach at night time. He wrote the song as a love song, inspired by everyday things. The imagery in the song was inspired by music interacting with the brain of someone falling asleep, creating mixed-up dreams.

Yamaguchi intentionally tried to create uncool and old-fashioned lyrics, in order to juxtapose with the song's modern sound. He wrote the lyrics an hommage to kayōkyoku pop lyrics of the 1970s and 1980s, specifically the songs of Momoe Yamaguchi and Akina Nakamori. Yamaguchi felt that stylistically, the song's chorus melody was directly inspired by Shōwa period kayōkyoku, but someone unfamiliar with the genre might misinterpret as purely inspired by dance music. After Yamaguchi finished songwriting, the band's guitarist Motoharu Iwadera arranged the initial demo, with bassist Ami Kusakari later reworking the demo to blend Iwadera's style with hers.

Yamaguchi wrote the single's B-side "Years" to complement "Bach no Senritsu o Yoru ni Kiita Sei Desu", feeling personally that the single was like a double A-side. Yamaguchi wrote these two songs at during the same period in his life, as therapy for him after the earthquake. "Years" is similarly a love song, but instead of taking inspiration from everyday ideas, focused on messages reacting to the "great anxiety" in society during the post-earthquake time in Japan. Yamaguchi was inspired to write the lyrics while reading Twitter in a café. He noticed a great gap between what people on his Twitter were tweeting, primarily messages about the earthquake, and what the people who were in the café were talking about, their love lives and employment. The song was primarily arranged by Ejima, who aimed to create something "beautiful". Iwadera's performance was recorded onto a cassette tape to alter the audio quality. As Yamaguchi felt that both songs were so similar conceptually, the band included both "Bach no Senritsu o Yoru ni Kiita Sei Desu" and "Years" on Documentaly in the same order as they appear on the single.

== Composition ==
"Bach no Senritsu o Yoru ni Kiita Sei Desu"
The electro to rock progression and choral elements in "Bach no Senritsu o Yoru ni Kiita Sei Desu" were praised by critics in Japan.

"Bach no Senritsu o Yoru ni Kiita Sei Desu" is a pop song that blends electronic dance music and "symphonic" choral work. The chorus features a choral backing of around twenty voices, which were created by recording the voices of each of the five members of Sakanaction around four times. During a refrain in the song, a short section of Johann Sebastian Bach's Concerto I in D minor, BWV 1052, first movement is performed by Okazaki on the piano. In the second half of the song, Okazaki performs a live organ as a part of the instrumental backing.

The lyrics were described by Yamaguchi as being the first love song that he had written. The lyrics are a person believing that the feelings that they are experiencing are being created by listening to a Bach melody at night time. The melody reminds him of the face of a woman and her "whimsical color", while he wonders why he is fascinated by the moon. He believes that he will soon forget these feelings.

== Promotion and release ==
The single was first announced on May 31, 2011, before the band had actually finished recording the songs and before the single's title had been decided. It was used in commercials for the yobikō Toshin High School, which was the third instance of a Sakanaction song being used for the school's commercials, after "Identity" (2010) and "Rookie" (2011). The song first aired on the Tokyo FM radio program School of Lock! on June 28. The song was released digitally on July 13, a week before the physical and digital EP editions of the single were released. The physical single and digital EP, in addition to "Bach no Senritsu o Yoru ni Kiita Sei Desu" and the song "Years", featured a remix of the band's song "Light Dance" by Japanese DJ Yoshinori Sunahara, as well as enhanced CD data featuring a lyric video for "Bach no Senritsu o Yoru ni Kiita Sei Desu" created with photos taken by Kamikene in Germany. Sunahara first contacted Sakanaction to remix a song of theirs during their earlier, less commercially successful period, however had not taken him up on his offer until 2011. Instead of being assigned a song, Sunahara personally chose "Light Dance" from the band's discography to remix.

On July 22, the band made their first appearance on the TV Asahi television program Music Station, performing the song. Yamaguchi appeared as a guest at the J-Wave radio program Radipedia on July 26, and on School of Lock! on July 20 to promote the song. During the single's release in July, the band were in the middle of recording sessions for their album Documentaly. On July 23, the band held a special Ustream broadcast to celebrate the single's release, shot in the studio where they were recording the album. A long interview with Yamaguchi was featured in Rockin' On Japan's August 2011 edition, where he discussed his motivations for creating music which were re-evaluated after the earthquake.

Since its release, four live performances of the song have been released by the band: on the band's Sakanaquarium 2011 Documentaly: Live at Makuhari Messe, Sakanaquarium 2013 Sakanaction: Live at Makuhari Messe 2013.5.19, and Sakanatribe 2014: Live at Tokyo Dome City Hall video albums, and one performance of the song appearing on their digitally exclusive live album Sakanaquarium 2012 "Zepp Alive" (2012). a recording of which was present on the DVD disc of the band's "Yoru no Odoriko" (2012) single.

In March 2013, a remix of the song by Ami Kusakari, "Bach no Senritsu o Yoru ni Kiita Sei Desu (Ks_Remix)" was featured as a bonus track on the band's sixth album Sakanaction. In August 2015, the single's B-side "Years" was compiled onto the band's compilation album Natsukashii Tsuki wa Atarashii Tsuki: Coupling & Remix Works, and also had a music video shot for the project, included in the album's visual media disc. Sunahara created an updated 2015 version of his remix of "Light Dance" from the single for inclusion in the compilation's remix CD.

== Cover artwork ==
The single's cover artwork features Ichiro Yamaguchi lying down in a fetal position, in front of a washing machine. Over top of the image are the words "Es ist weil ich die Musik von Bach Nachts höre" - a German language translation of the title. The artwork was created by the band's longtime collaborator Kamikene of the group Hatos, who coincidentally was in Germany when the band asked him to create the artwork. The German translation was offered by a German contact Kamikene had, after letting them listen to the song. The photo of Yamaguchi was taken late at night in Yamaguchi's own apartment, an idea which came from the photographer, who wanted to take candid photos of Yamaguchi to create a documentary-like and everyday feel. The photo was taken of Yamaguchi asleep, after an all-night long drinking party that Yamaguchi held.

Much like the band's other singles from 2010 and 2011, "Aruku Around", "Identity" and "Rookie", an alternative artwork for the single's preceding iTunes release was created, showing Yamaguchi in a similarly styled image, asleep on his couch.

The washing machine was featured in a scene from the band's music video for "Document" (2011), where singer-songwriter Kanae Hoshiba, playing the role of a stalker, recreates the cover artwork scene at Yamaguchi's residence.

== Music video ==
The music video was directed by Yūsuke Tanaka, and was released to YouTube on July 13, 2011, twelve days after it was recorded in a warehouse on July 1. It begins with Yamaguchi looking into a mirror, in an old-fashioned Western room at midnight with portraits of Bach on the walls. During the chorus, the walls of the room open, revealing Yamaguchi behind them performing a "bar dance", with four mannequins laterally attached to him, mimicking his movements. These mannequins are created in the likeness of Yamaguchi, and are dressed in the same clothing. Further scenes in the video show Yamaguchi together with the mannequins in the room, in activities such as having dinner and drawing portraits. In the final third of the video, a "bewitching" woman played by actress Kumiko Asō comes into the room and kisses one of Yamaguchi's mannequins.

As with the band's other music videos, they requested stylist Hisashi "Momo" Kitazawa to find a director, this time using the key words "dance" and "idiot". Yamaguchi wanted to focus on the video being entertaining, rather than artistic. Thinking of these concepts, Kitazawa wanted a video for the song that would hook in viewers, where the initial viewing came across as humorous, but subsequent viewings were not. Kitazawa felt director Yūsuke Tanaka's style would fit well with the video, and called him to offer the job while Tanaka at the airport heading to Hawaii for a separate filming project. Tanaka accepted, but initially felt daunted because of the high quality of the band's previous videos, however spelt his remaining time in Hawaii worried about appropriate ideas for the project. On returning to Japan, he met with Kitazawa, to discuss how to create a dance-related project that was not strictly just dance.

Tanaka wanted to create a three-minute story, and tried to stress storytelling in the video over imagery. Tanaka added the "bewitching" woman to the video to introduce jealousy and conflict between Yamaguchi and the mannequins, who had worked together in the previous scenes. The "bar dance" was choreographed by Furitsuke Kagyou Air:Man, a group who had worked together with Sakanaction for the music video for "Native Dancer" (2009).

At the 2012 Space Shower Music Video Awards, the music video won the Best Video of the Year award, chosen from 50 nominations. This was the second consecutive year for the band to win this award, after 2010's "Aruku Around". The video was also one of five videos nominated for the Best Rock Video at the 2012 MTV Video Music Awards Japan, however lost to One Ok Rock's "Answer Is Near".

== Reception ==
=== Critical reception ===
The song was well received by music reviewers in Japan. Toshitomo Doumei of Skream! praised the song's "ecstatic beat" and "elegant piano", while CDJournal reviewers thought very highly of the song's "smart dance music" sense. They called the song a "killer tune", praising the "gospel-like" chorus and the song's sudden progression from electro to rock. They further noted the "slightly twisted" electro sound, "friendly" melody and the "literary" lyrical world of the lyrics, and felt that the "surging" four on the floor rhythm was the driving force of the song.

Dai Onojima of Rockin' On Japan felt that the classical piano phrase and the choral work arrangement were very characteristic of Sakanaction. He noted that the song felt simple compared to the "busyness" of the group's previous single "Rookie", and that the song was one of the band's most strongly structured as a pop song. Tetsuo Hiraga of Hot Express felt that the song followed the same idea as the band's previous singles, mixing art music with entertainment music.

=== Commercial reception ===
In its first week on Oricon's physical singles chart, "Bach no Senritsu o Yoru ni Kiita Sei Desu" reached number eight, selling 15,000 copies. Rival sales tracking agency SoundScan Japan found that the vast majority of copies sold in the first week were of the single's limited enhanced data edition. After seven weeks in the top 200 releases, the single managed to sell a total of 23,000 copies. In April 2014, the Recording Industry Association of Japan certified the song gold for 100,000 paid digital downloads in Japan.

== Track listings ==
digital download
No.	Title	Length
1.	"Bach no Senritsu o Yoru ni Kiita Sei Desu"	4:00
Total length:		4:00

All tracks are written by Ichiro Yamaguchi.

Physical single, digital EP
No.	Title	Length
1.	"Bach no Senritsu o Yoru ni Kiita Sei Desu"	4:00
2.	"Years"	4:26
3.	"Light Dance (YSST Remix 2011)" (ライトダンス Raito Dansu)	4:09
Total length:		12:35

== Personnel ==
Personnel details were sourced from Documentaly's liner notes booklet. Music video personnel details were sourced from Sakanarchive 2007—2011: Sakanaction Music Video Collection.

Sakanaction

- All members – arrangement, production
- Keiichi Ejima – drums
- Motoharu Iwadera – guitar
- Ami Kusakari – bass guitar
- Emi Okazaki – keyboards
- Ichiro Yamaguchi – vocals, guitar, lyrics, composition

Personnel

- Minoru Iwabuchi – executive producer (Victor Entertainment)
- Hayato Kumaki – manager
- Kensuke Maeda – assistant engineer for Alive Recording Studio
- Satoshi Tajima – executive producer (Hip Land Music Corporation)
- Masashi Uramoto – mixing, recording
- Naoki Yokota – executive producer (Victor Entertainment)

Music video personnel

- Aoi Production – production company
- Kumiko Asō – cast member
- Atsuyoshi Edahiro – art
- Furitsuke Kagyou Air:man – choreography
- Akira Hosaka – producer
- Kenji Ishida – hair, make-up
- Go Ito – producer
- Hisashi "Momo" Kitazawa – creative director, stylist
- O.F – equipment supplier
- Kotaro Saruwatari of Sudo Art – dollmakers
- Takayoshi Sasai – computer-generated imagery
- Kento Shimizu – production manager
- Yūsuke Tanaka – director
- Shoji Uchida – camera
- Akifumi Yone'i – lighting
- Ichiro Yamaguchi – cast member

== Charts ==
Chart (2011)	Peak position
Japan Billboard Adult Contemporary Airplay	11
Japan Billboard Japan Hot 100	4
Japan Oricon weekly singles	8
Japan RIAJ Digital Track Chart	30

== Certification and sales ==
Region	Certification	Certified units/sales
Japan (Oricon) (physical single sales)	—	23,000
Japan (RIAJ)	Gold	100,000^{*}
^{*} Sales figures based on certification alone.

== Release history ==
Region	Date	Format	Distributing Label	Catalog codes
Japan	June 28, 2011	radio add date	Victor Entertainment	
Japan	June 29, 2011	ringtone	Victor Entertainment	
Japan	July 13, 2010	digital download	Victor Entertainment	
Japan	July 20, 2011	CD single, limited edition CD/DVD single	Victor Entertainment	VICL-36645, VICL-36646
South Korea	August 2, 2011	digital download	J-Box Entertainment	
Japan	August 6, 2011	rental CD single	Victor Entertainment	VICL-36646
