= Rookie (Sakanaction song) =

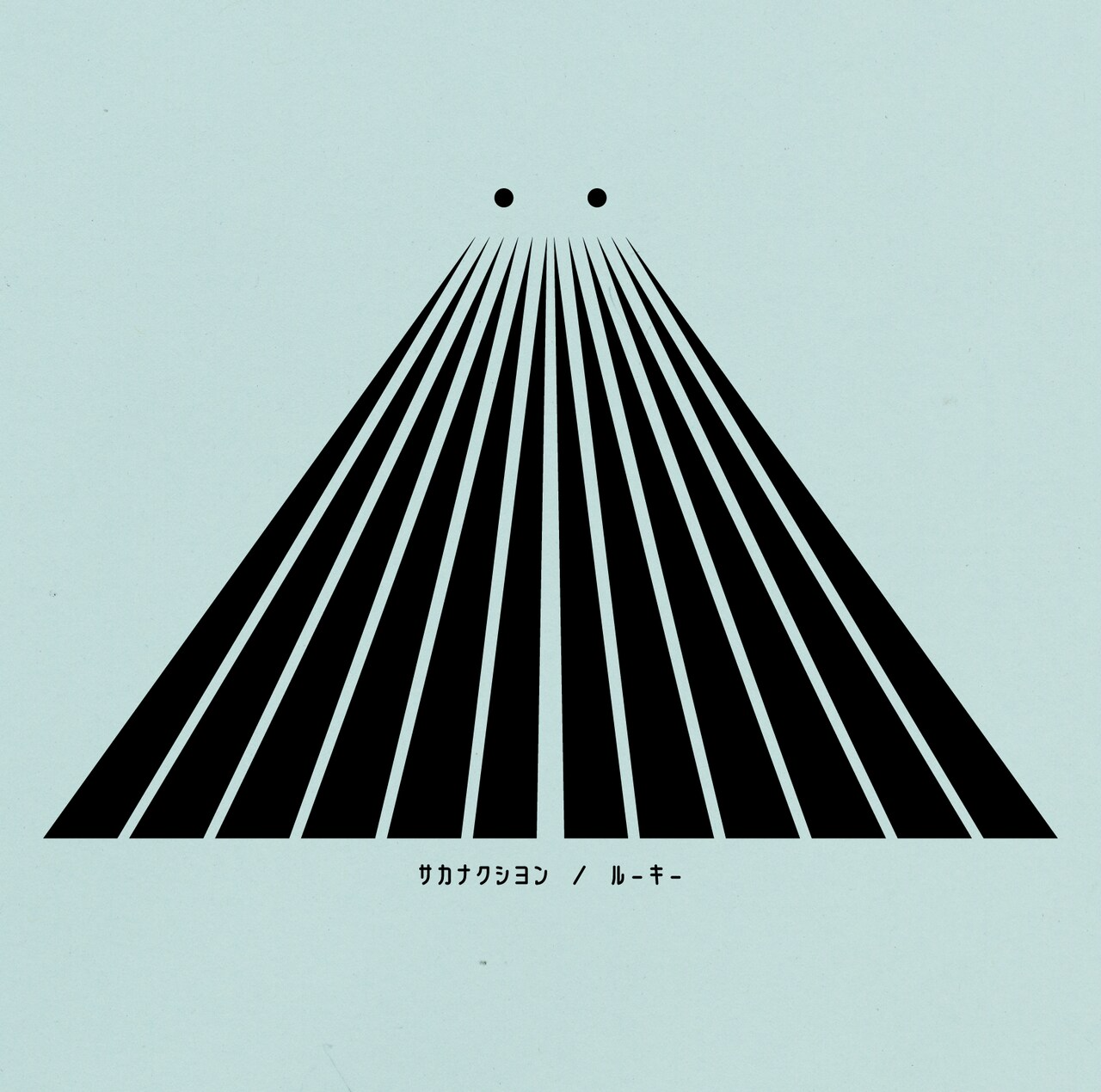
- Physical CD single and digital EP editions' cover.

Single by Sakanaction

from the album Documentaly
- Released: March 9, 2011
- Recorded: 2011
- Genre: Dance-rock, techno, electronica, folk, electro, psychedelic rock
- Length: 5:21
- Label: Victor Entertainment
- Songwriter: Ichiro Yamaguchi
- Producer: Sakanaction

Sakanaction singles chronology
"Identity" (2010)	"Rookie" (2011)	"Bach no Senritsu o Yoru ni Kiita Sei Desu" (2011)

"Rookie" (Japanese: ルーキー, Hepburn: Rūkī) (Japanese pronunciation: [ɾɯ:ki:]) is a song by Japanese band Sakanaction, released as their second single from Documentaly in March 2011. The song was stylistically different from the band's previous singles, featuring a strong electronic dance music sound, which reviewers in Japan praised for its tenacity, and its fusion of dance and rock music.

The physical edition of the single was released five days before the 2011 Tōhoku earthquake and tsunami, which caused a delayed release in many regions of Japan. Much of the promotional activity was cancelled or postponed, with vocalist Ichiro Yamaguchi preferring to focus on raising spirits during radio interviews over promoting the song.

== Background and development ==
After the release of the band's fourth album Kikuuiki in 2010, led by the single "Aruku Around", Sakanaction performed a thirteen-date national tour of Japan in April and May of the same year, Sakanaquarium 2010 Kikuuiki. At the tour final on May 28 at Zepp Tokyo, the band performed a song entitled "Identity" for the first time during the concert's encore, a song that had first been written early in the Kikuuiki recording sessions in 2009, and recorded just after the band finished recording music for the album. On the same day, the song was announced as the band's next single, scheduled for release in August.

The single was well received by music critics in Japan, praising the work for its upbeat arrangement incorporating Latin percussion. Commercially, the single reached number twelve on the Oricon singles chart. This performance was better than the band's 2008 single "Sen to Rei", however the release under-performed compared to 2010's "Aruku Around".

On October 8, 2010, the band performed their first concert at the Nippon Budokan, Sakanaquarium 21.1 (B). During the performance, the band performed a new composition, "Slow Motion", which became one of the B-side tracks for the "Rookie" single. On October 23, the band held a live streaming session on Ustream, in order to show their audience the methods they use to create music. While the band watched a video clip produced by director Daisuke Shimada, they improvised a soundtrack to match the clip. The piece of music that they created during the broadcast was included in the "Rookie" single as the song "Montage". The pre-production process for recording "Rookie" began in January 2011. Originally the band planned to release "Endless" as the second single from their album Documentaly, however Yamaguchi was not fully satisfied with the song and continued to work on it until August 2011; releasing "Rookie" in its place.

On February 22, 2011, Sakanaction released a set of DVDs entitled Sakanaquarium 2010. Coming in three different packages, Sakanaquarium 2010 (B) covered the band's Nippon Budokan concert, while Sakanaquarium 2010 (C) was a recording of the final concert of the band's Sakanaquarium 2010 Kikuuiki tour, recorded at Shinkiba Studio Coast on May 15. The third package compiled both concerts and added a third DVD, Sakanaquarium 2010 (D), featuring tour documentary and interview footage. On January 29, a month before the release of the DVDs, "Rookie" was announced as the band's next single. The band first performed "Rookie" at their live event Version 21.1, held at Zepp Tokyo on February 11.

== Writing and inspiration ==
"Rookie" was written by Ichiro Yamaguchi after the band's concert at the Nippon Budokan. Though the concert was an important milestone for the band, the actual concert felt like more of a ritual than a genuine milestone to Yamaguchi. This left Yamaguchi wondering what direction the band should take next, what Sakanaction's place in the music scene was, and how the band was seen by others. Yamaguchi wanted to create a song that expressed the reasons that Sakanaction make music. The song was also inspired by Yamaguchi's experience with sensorineural hearing loss before the Sakanaquarium 2010: Kikuuiki tour, which left him with only partial hearing abilities in his right ear, similarly wondering how someone with hearing loss could contribute to music. Yamaguchi wrote "Rookie" mostly about the suffering he was experiencing at the time.

"Rookie" was created intending to have a strong stylistic difference to the band's previous singles, this time based on a strong club music base. The band recorded the song at Alive Recording Studio in Setagaya and at Freedom Studio in Shinjuku; both locations in Tokyo, and created a separate arrangement for the song for when the band performed it at concerts.

== Composition ==
"Rookie"
The dance and rock music blend seen in "Rookie" was praised by Japanese music critics.

"Rookie" is a song based on a strong electronic dance music sound, but also incorporates elements of rock, pop, electro and psychedelic rock. The lyrics describe a sleepless person at night time, and are primarily short repeating phrases; including the song's chorus lyrics, which are a series of verbs.

== Promotion and release ==
The song was used in commercials for the yobikō Toshin High School, which was the second instance of a Sakanaction song being used for the school's commercials, after "Identity" (2010). Due to the effects of the 2011 Tōhoku earthquake and tsunami on March 11, 2011, Sakanaction cancelled or rescheduled many of their scheduled radio appearances. Sakanaction appeared on NHK's Top Runner on March 19, a week after their initially scheduled appearance. Yamaguchi found in his radio appearances that he dedicated very little time to promoting the song itself, instead focusing on messages for the victims of the earthquake.

On March 16, the physical edition of the single was released, featuring the B-sides "Slow Motion" and "Montage". A limited edition of the single was produced, which featured CD Extra video data of "Montage"'s music video. The first press issue version of the single featured a code to apply for the band's June tour of Zepp concert venues in Japan, Sakanaquarium 2011: Zepp Alive. On March 18, an official cellphone application was released for the song on the iTunes App Store. In the April edition of Rockin' On Japan, an interview with Yamaguchi about the single was featured.

Since its release, the song has become a staple of the band's concert set-lists. Four recordings of performances of the song have been released, on the band's Sakanaquarium 2011 Documentaly: Live at Makuhari Messe, Sakanaquarium 2013 Sakanaction: Live at Makuhari Messe 2013.5.19, and Sakanatribe 2014: Live at Tokyo Dome City Hall video albums. A performance of the song also appears on their digitally exclusive live album Sakanaquarium 2012 "Zepp Alive" (2012); a recording of which was present on the DVD disc of the band's "Yoru no Odoriko" (2012) single. In 2012 the song was remixed by Japanese DJ Takkyu Ishino for inclusion on the group's single "Boku to Hana".

In August 2015, the single's B-sides "Slow Motion" and "Montage" were featured on the Tsuki no Namigata disc of the band's album Natsukashii Tsuki wa Atarashii Tsuki: Coupling & Remix Works, with a new music video created for "Slow Motion" for the album. Additionally, "Rookie (Takkyu Ishino Remix)" was featured on the Tsuki no Hen'yō remix disc of the release.

== Cover artwork and booklet ==
The cover artwork was designed by Kamikene of Hatos and Normalization, who was inspired to create a simple, geometric pattern after hearing the song's style. The single featured a 24-page booklet attached to it, designed by Kamikene with photography by Daisuke Ishizaka, which was created at the request of Yamaguchi, who wanted to stress the importance of physical CDs as a medium. Much like Sakanaction's 2010 singles "Aruku Around" and "Identity", an alternative artwork was created for the preceding iTunes release of the single.

== Music video ==
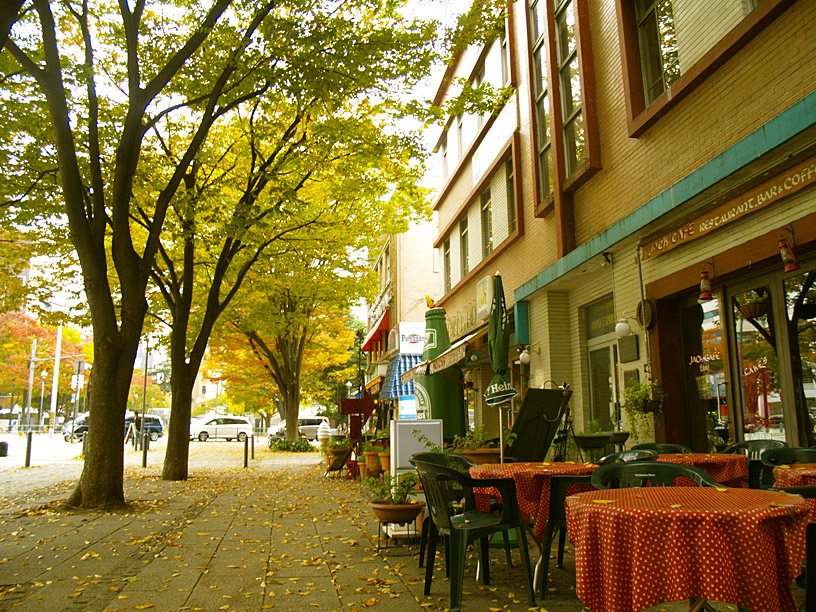
The music video featured scenes shot in the Kaigan-dōri area of Yokohama.

The music video was directed by Daisuke Shimada, who had previously worked with the band for the music videos for "Me ga Aku Aiiro" and "Montage", and was uploaded to YouTube on March 4, 2011. The video was filmed over two days, on February 21 and 22, 2011, and was shot in two locations: opposite the Yokohama Silk Museum on Kaigan-dōri in Naka-ku, Yokohama and in a warehouse. The work features Yamaguchi as the video's protagonist, and begins with a scene of him falling in darkness. He wakes up in his bedroom, and finds himself stuck in a time loop, where after he walks outside, the same events occur, leading to him finding a woman in a green dress who has fallen to her death. Each time after he sees the woman, he runs away, and falls into darkness after opening a door. In the final loop, Yamaguchi reaches the scene before the woman has fallen. After turning around, he finds her instantly on the ground.

The falling effect was an idea that Yamaguchi and Shimada created together, and involved Yamaguchi falling from scaffolding inside a warehouse from a height of four metres, recorded by high speed cameras. Shimada intended for the video's repeating scenes to create a sense of uncertainty, over what is a dream and what is reality. He spent much of his time trying to create suspense throughout the video, and for the video's final scene of the woman, who for the final scene was Yamaguchi, wearing the clothes of the woman.

== Reception ==
=== Critical reception ===
Excite Japan reviewers felt that the song was the "highest dimension fusion" of club music with rock music, and was new ground for the band. They praised the song's "tenacious sound" and for being elaborate yet bold. They were impressed by Yamaguchi's lyrics that "recall the indecision of adolescence", as well as his vocals which managed to "shake off these worries". Tetsuo Hiraga felt that "Rookie" was a signature song for a new style of Sakanaction music that was an even more intense blend of entertainment music and art music. He praised the song for managing to be even more danceable than their previous singles. CDJournal reviewers similarly praised the song's beat that "intertwined howl-like synthesizers and Ichiro Yamaguchi's vocals", as well as the "tightly packed" blend of rock and dance music. They considered the highlights of the song the "verge of collapse" beats that "broke down the bridge", as well as Yamaguchi's "abstract" lyrics. Excite reviewers noted the song's basis was club music, that incorporated elements of electro, psychedelic, rock, pop and tribal beats.

=== Commercial reception ===
On Oricon's physical singles chart, "Rookie" debuted at number six, selling 9,000 copies in its first week, while rival sales tracking agency SoundScan Japan tracked 8,000 physical copies in the same period. The Tōhoku earthquake and tsunami disaster affected the single's availability in stores, as several distribution centers in Eastern Japan sustained damage. Because of this, the single had a delayed release in the Tōhoku, Kōshin'etsu and Kantō regions of Japan, including the capital Tokyo. After spending six weeks in the top 200 releases, the single sold a total of 17,000 copies.

== Track listings ==
digital download
No.	Title	Length
1.	"Rookie"	5:21
Total length:		5:21

physical single, digital EP
No.	Title	Writer(s)	Length
1.	"Rookie"	Ichiro Yamaguchi	5:21
2.	"Slow Motion" (スローモーション Surō Mōshon)	Yamaguchi	5:16
3.	"Montage"	Sakanaction	6:11
Total length:			16:48

== Personnel ==
Personnel details were sourced from "Rookie" and Documentaly's liner notes booklets. Music video personnel details were sourced from Sakanarchive 2007—2011: Sakanaction Music Video Collection.

Sakanaction

- All members – arrangement, production
- Keiichi Ejima – drums
- Motoharu Iwadera – guitar
- Ami Kusakari – bass guitar
- Emi Okazaki – keyboards
- Ichiro Yamaguchi – vocals, guitar, lyrics, composition

Personnel

- John David – single mastering
- Daisuke Ishizaka (Hatos, Normalization) – art photography for booklet
- Minoru Iwabuchi – executive producer (Victor Entertainment)
- Kamikene (Hatos, Normalization) – art direction
- Hayato Kumaki – manager
- Kensuke Maeda – assistant engineer for Alive Recording Studio
- Satoshi Tajima – executive producer (Hip Land Music Corporation)
- Masashi Uramoto – mixing, recording
- Naoki Yokota – executive producer (Victor Entertainment)

Music video personnel

- Daniel Adrian – cast (police officer)
- Dorosheva Anastasia – cast (fallen woman)
- Enzo – art design
- Shin'ichi Futagami – editing
- Yūko Hashimoto – sound editing
- Takehiro Ikuta – producer
- Sōjirō Kamatani – stop animation
- Hisashi "Momo" Kitazawa – creative director, stylist
- Kayoko Maekawa – lighting
- Jun Nakao – production manager
- Asami Nemoto – hair, make-up
- Rock & Roll Japan – production company
- Daisuke Shimada – director, cameraman, editing
- Yukina Tadkoro – cast (girl with balloon)
- Sensō Ueno – camera
- Ichiro Yamaguchi – cast (main, fallen woman [final scene])

== Charts ==
Chart (2011)	Peak position
Japan Billboard Adult Contemporary Airplay	9
Japan Billboard Japan Hot 100	7
Japan Oricon weekly singles	6

=== Sales ===
Chart	Amount
Oricon physical sales	17,000

== Release history ==
Region	Date	Format	Distributing Label	Catalog codes
Japan	February 21, 2011	radio add date	Victor Entertainment	—N/a
Japan	February 23, 2011	ringtone	Victor Entertainment	—N/a
Japan	March 9, 2011	digital download	Victor Entertainment	—N/a
Japan	March 16, 2011	CD single, limited edition CD Extra single	Victor Entertainment	VICL-36623, VICL-36624
Japan	April 2, 2011	rental CD single	Victor Entertainment	VICL-36624
South Korea	May 2, 2011	digital download	J-Box Entertainment	—N/a
