= Endless (Sakanaction song) =

Song by Sakanaction

from the album Documentaly
- Language: Japanese
- Released: September 28, 2011
- Recorded: 2011
- Genre: Pop, electro, rock
- Length: 3:47
- Label: Victor Entertainment
- Songwriter: Ichiro Yamaguchi
- Producer: Sakanaction

"Endless" (Japanese: エンドレス, Hepburn: Endoresu) (Japanese pronunciation: [endoɾesɯ]) is a song by Japanese band Sakanaction. It was the leading promotional track from the band's fifth studio album Documentaly, released on September 28, 2011. Created primarily by the band's vocalist Ichiro Yamaguchi over a period of eight months, the song was written as a record of what it was like to live in 2011. The song was the central composition of Documentaly, affecting the album's track order and composition.

The song received strong radio airplay in Japan around the album's release date in Japan, reaching number eight on the Billboard Japan Hot 100. Critics praised the song as "ambitious", noting the song's progression, fusion of electronic music and rock genres and "symbolic" lyrics.

== Background and development ==
In August 2010, Sakanaction released the single "Identity", a song that had first been written early in the recording sessions for their fourth album Kikuuiki in 2009, and recorded just after the band finished recording music for the album. On October 8, 2010, the band performed their first concert at the Nippon Budokan, Sakanaquarium 21.1 (B). The concert experience inspired the band to write "Rookie", which the band began pre-production demo recordings for in January 2011. After finishing work on "Rookie", Yamaguchi began writing and recording "Endless". Originally the band planned to release "Endless" as the second single after "Identity" from their album Documentaly, however Yamaguchi was not fully satisfied with the song and continued to work on it; releasing "Rookie" in its place in March 2011. Just prior to "Rookie"'s planned physical release on March 16, 2011, Japan experienced the 2011 Tōhoku earthquake and tsunami on March 11, 2011. Sakanaction cancelled or rescheduled many of their scheduled radio appearances, and during their appearances preferred to focus on messages of hope for the victims of the earthquake, rather than directly promoting the single.

== Writing and inspiration ==
Band vocalist and songwriter Ichiro Yamaguchi had difficulty finalising "Endless", feeling dissatisfied with the lyrics. He felt that releasing music was an act of pointing at yourself; stating to everyone that you are a certain type of person. Considering this, he wanted to create a song that directly reflected his inner feelings perfectly, but felt that he needed new lyrical techniques to do so. Yamaguchi felt as if he relied on his pre-existing lyrical techniques such as wordplay, the lyrics would not truly express his ideas. Eventually, he rewrote the song 74 times, creating a total of 78 different versions of the song lyrics. While Yamaguchi struggled actualising "Endless", the band worked on the other compositions included in Documentaly, returning to "Endless" each time. Yamaguchi focused on "Endless", acting as the driving force for the song's creation, and had little input on the production of the other songs on Documentaly. He felt that the song's "groove" was an extremely important part of the song, so discussed the song at length with the band's drummer Keiichi Ejima. Yamaguchi utilised a technique where he slowly added a progression of instruments to the song, which he believed would control the emotional sentiment. During the trial and error process, Yamaguchi removed an entire section of the song's melody, in order to make the composition simpler.

The events of 2011 greatly affected the writing process for the song, including the Tōhoku earthquake and tsunami in March, the death of electronic musician Rei Harakami in July and turmoil in Yamaguchi's personal life. Yamaguchi wanted both the song and Documentaly to act as a record of what it was like to live in the post-earthquake period of 2011 in Japan, so expressed all of these events while writing the song. While questioning what were distinct things about living in 2011, Yamaguchi was inspired to write lyrics about online opinions. He noted that in YouTube-style commentary, people posted their opinions primarily as reactions to other peoples' opinions, while the majority of people had a third-person view of the entire process. He felt that this series of comments upon comments was a very particular aspect of living in 2011.

Yamaguchi considered the song the most central composition on the album. The other compositions on the album were arranged to complement it, especially the preceding song "Ryūsen" and the following song, the instrumental track "Documentary". Yamaguchi felt that the synth elements in the song's second half linked to the instrumental track. The song was finally completed on August 5, on the morning before the band's performance at the Rock in Japan Festival; eight months after the song was first written. It was the final song written for the album, but the second to last song recorded, before "Monochrome Tokyo", however for Yamaguchi and the band, they felt that when "Endless" was completed, it felt that Documentaly was finally complete.

== Composition ==
"Endless"
Music critics praised the musical progression, beginning with a simple piano arrangement and gradually incorporating rock and electronic elements.

"Endless" is a pop song recorded in common time, with a length of three minutes and forty-seven seconds. The song begins with a progression of instruments layered on top of each other, beginning with a bare piano sound, with drums and later strings added before Yamaguchi begins singing. Further rock band instruments and techno elements are added as the song progresses, with the song ending in a louder electronic dance section.

The lyrics of the song talk about the people behind someone who laughs at another person: behind them is someone who further laughs at him, and someone who is sad. When thinking about this, the song's protagonist blocks his ears, but can still hear somebody's voice. He wonders whose voice can "color a blind night". In the final stanza, he feels that when he points to himself, he feels stuck with fear, but realises the voice that can change everything is his own.

== Promotion and release ==
"Endless" debuted on Japanese radio on August 31, 2011, during the Tokyo FM program School of Lock!. In the first five days, the song received enough radio airplay to reach number 49 on the Billboard radio songs sub-chart. The song received its strongest airplay in early October, after Documentaly's release, when it was the fourth most played song on Japanese radio for the week. The strong airplay led "Endless" to reach number eight on the Billboard Japan Hot 100 in the same week.

Some versions of Documentaly came packaged with a DVD featuring DocumentaLy Documentary, a half an hour documentary detailing the recording process of the song. Since its release, only two live performances of the song have been released by the band: on the band's Sakanaquarium 2011 Documentaly: Live at Makuhari Messe and Sakanatribe 2014: Live at Tokyo Dome City Hall video albums.

== Music video ==
The music video was co-directed by Takumi Shiga alongside the band's long-time stylist Hisashi "Momo" Kitazawa, and was unveiled on YouTube on September 28, 2011, the same day as the album's release. The video features a white dodecahedron in a dark room, where Sakanaction are playing inside. Each band member is wearing a mask in the shape of a large eyeball, making their faces invisible. Over the top of the shape, bright patterned lights are cast, sometimes showing brief glimpses of the band member's faces, primarily of Yamaguchi. One shot briefly shows Yamaguchi falling overlaid with words, in the style of the Documentaly album cover artwork. In the final scene, the band can be seen watching themselves in the dodecahedron. They remove their masks, to show the dodecahedron with a brain pattern instead of their faces.

The general theme that the band requested for the video was one of sociality and reflecting current society. As "Endless" was a non-single song, the band wanted a video that would express the entire Documentaly album. Shiga took inspiration directly from the song's lyrics, wanting to express the lyrical theme of one statement being able to make different people laugh or cry. He took inspiration from the "sad people" lyric to create the eyeball costumes worn by the band, and used the facial masks to make the members anonymous, so that the lyrics would be interpreted as applying to anyone.

Projecting images onto a shape was an idea that both directors decided on together in a meeting. Shiga had only four days to create the projections before the video shoot, so contracted the work to an artist he previous collaborated with called Masaya Yoshida, as well as an art creation company. The projections of the members' faces were taken from video chats with the band members before the video recording. The dodecahedron was an idea of Kitazawa's, as he considered it one of the most beautiful shapes, and felt that a beautiful shape would work well as a metaphor for the human brain. The shape is made of scrim attached to a wire frame, in order for both the members and the projections to be seen. Two projectors were used to display the images onto the dodecahedron. No trial run was done before the video's shooting, and instead Shiga modelled the set-up as a computer-aided design until he was satisfied with the arrangement.

== Critical reception ==
Yuya Shimizu of Rolling Stone Japan praised the effort that went into "Endless", calling a "compilation-like work". He felt that the ambitiousness of the song reminded him of electronic musician Rei Harakami, especially his remix of the band's song "Native Dancer". CDJournal reviewers praised the "calm piano intro" that transitioned from the album's previous song "Ryūsen", and how the song progressed into "a Sakanaction-like electro and rock fusion sound". They praised Yamaguchi's lyrics, feeling they were "symbolic" and "like two recursive mirrors".

== Personnel ==
Personnel details were sourced from Documentaly's liner notes booklet. Music video personnel details were sourced from Sakanarchive 2007—2011: Sakanaction Music Video Collection.

Sakanaction

- All members – arrangement, production
- Keiichi Ejima – drums
- Motoharu Iwadera – guitar
- Ami Kusakari – bass guitar
- Emi Okazaki – keyboards
- Ichiro Yamaguchi – vocals, guitar, lyrics, composition

Personnel

- Minoru Iwabuchi – executive producer (Victor Entertainment)
- Hayato Kumaki – manager
- Kensuke Maeda – assistant engineer for Alive Recording Studio
- Satoshi Tajima – executive producer (Hip Land Music Corporation)
- Masashi Uramoto – mixing, recording
- Naoki Yokota – executive producer (Victor Entertainment)

Music video personnel

- Daisuke Hiraga – producer
- Hisashi "Momo" Kitazawa – co-director, stylist
- Asami Nemoto – hair, make-up
- Hideki Numata – graphics
- Takumi Shiga – director, graphics
- Daisuke Suwa – production manager
- P.I.C.S. – production company
- Shoji Uchida – cameraman
- Akifumi Yone'i – lighting
- Masaya Yoshida – art

== Charts ==
Chart (2011)	Peak position
Japan Billboard Adult Contemporary Airplay	12
Japan Billboard Japan Hot 100	8

== Release history ==
Region	Date	Format	Distributing Label
Japan	August 31, 2011	radio add date	Victor Entertainment
