= Documentaly =

Studio album by Sakanaction
- Released: September 28, 2011
- Recorded: 2010–2011
- Genres: Dance rock, pop, electronic
- Length: 54:14
- Language: Japanese
- Label: Victor Entertainment
- Producer: Sakanaction

Sakanaction chronology
Kikuuiki (2010)	Documentaly (2011)	Sakanaquarium 2012: Zepp Alive (2012)

Singles from Documentaly
- 1. "Identity" Released: July 7, 2010; 2. "Rookie" Released: March 9, 2011; 3. "Bach no Senritsu o Yoru ni Kiita Sei Desu" Released: July 13, 2011

Documentaly (stylized as DocumentaLy, Japanese pronunciation: [dokʲɯmentaɾi:]) is the fifth studio album by Japanese band Sakanaction, released on September 28, 2011. Written around a documentary theme, the band were inspired by personal and world events in 2011 to create material for the album.

The band decided to release three singles prior to the album, as a way to alleviate the pressure that the band felt to release new music after the success of their previous album Kikuuiki (2010), and as a way to show the album's development process. The first single "Identity", a song originally written during that album's recording sessions, was released three months after Kikuuiki. The band intended to release "Endless" as the album's second single, however as they were not fully satisfied with the song, released "Rookie" in its place in March 2011. Just prior to the single's physical release, Japan experienced the 2011 Tōhoku earthquake and tsunami on March 11, 2011, which made Yamaguchi re-evaluate the reasons why the band made music. Originally, the album's documentary concept focused on themselves as a band, but the disaster prompted Yamaguchi to take inspiration from world events such as the earthquake. "Bach no Senritsu o Yoru ni Kiita Sei Desu", released as the album's third single in July, was written as therapy for Yamaguchi during this time.

The album was primarily created in the first half of 2011. The band began work on the song "Endless", and continued to develop it over the course of eight months, however due to Yamaguchi's dissatisfaction with the piece. Most of the album's remaining songs were recorded in breaks between the work on "Endless". Yamaguchi spent much of this time writing lyrics that would express 2011 as a concept, and entrusted the album's arrangement to the other band members. The album's other tracks were ordered to complement "Endless", and are generally ordered chronologically in the order each song was written. The song "Endless" was used as the main promotional track for the album, which was sent to radio stations and given a music video. The band toured the album from October to November with their Sakanaquarium 2011 tour, performing 15 dates at 13 venues in Japan.

The album was well received by critics in Japan, who praised the album's blend of dance, rock and electronic genres, and felt that the documentary theme expressed the preciousness of music. The album was one of the 13 prize-winning entries for the 2012 CD Shop Awards, and iTunes Japan's iTunes Rewind 2011 awards named it the best album of the year. Commercially, the album was a success, reaching number two on Oricon's albums chart, and being certified gold for 100,000 physical copies shipped to stored by the Recording Industry Association of Japan.

== Background and development ==
In March 2010, Sakanaction released their fourth studio album, Kikuuiki. It was the band's most commercially successful album up until that point, but Yamaguchi felt disappointed by the sales, expecting the album to sell over 100,000 copies. Yamaguchi felt that the band's sound on Kikuuiki was inaccessible to some pop listeners, leading to the album not selling well, but also felt the pressure from their new-found audience to release more music. In order for the band to sell more and become more well known, Yamaguchi felt that Sakanaction should utilize new techniques to promote themselves, such as appearing more in media and on television. One of these techniques was to release three singles before the album; something that he believed would show a story-like development of Sakanaction's album creation process, as well as alleviate the increased pressure he felt to release more Sakanaction music. At the Sakanaquarium 2010 Kikuuiki tour final on May 28 at Zepp Tokyo, the band performed a song entitled "Identity" for the first time during the concert's encore, a song that had first been written early in the Kikuuiki recording sessions in 2009, and recorded just after the band finished recording music for the album. On the same day, the song was announced as the band's next single, released in August.

On October 8, 2010, the band performed their first concert at the Nippon Budokan, Sakanaquarium 21.1 (B), performing material from their first four albums, along with "Identity". "Rookie" was written by Ichiro Yamaguchi after the band's concert at the Nippon Budokan. Though the concert was an important milestone for the band, the actual concert felt like more of a ritual than a genuine milestone to Yamaguchi. This left Yamaguchi wondering what direction the band should take next, what Sakanaction's place in the music scene was, and how the band was seen by others. Yamaguchi wanted to create a song that expressed the reasons that Sakanaction made music. The pre-production process for recording "Rookie" began in January 2011. Originally the band planned to release "Endless" as the second single from Documentaly, however Yamaguchi was not fully satisfied with the song and continued to work on it until August 2011; releasing "Rookie" in its place. The documentary theme for the album was fully conceptualized in January, during the "Rookie" and early "Endless" recording sessions, developed from Yamaguchi's feelings of wanting to express himself more. On February 22, 2011, Sakanaction released a set of DVDs entitled Sakanaquarium 2010. Coming in three different packages, Sakanaquarium 2010 (B) covered the band's Nippon Budokan concert, while Sakanaquarium 2010 (C) was a recording of the final concert of the band's Sakanaquarium 2010 Kikuuiki tour, recorded at Shinkiba Studio Coast on May 15. The third package compiled both concerts and added a third DVD, Sakanaquarium 2010 (D), featuring tour documentary and interview footage. The band found that the public's response to Sakanaquarium 2010 (D) was so positive, that it strengthened their documentary-themed album concept. Instead of merely adopting it as a theme, Sakanaction decided to record an actual documentary of the album's creation process, on an additional visual media disc.

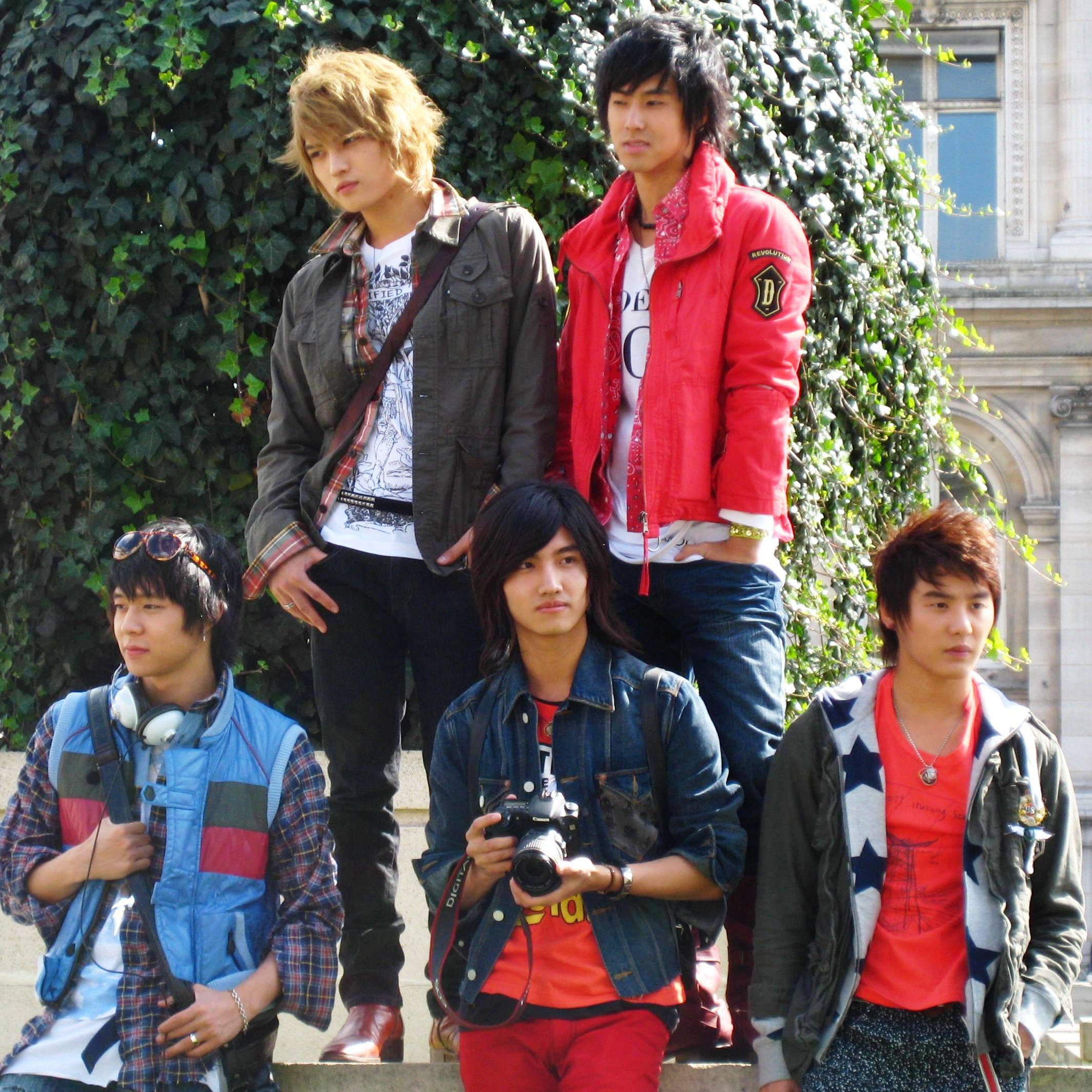
Ichiro Yamaguchi wanted to create music that would resonate with a general pop music audience, such as that of South Korean boyband TVXQ.

Just prior to "Rookie"'s physical single release, Japan experienced the 2011 Tōhoku earthquake and tsunami on March 11, 2011. Sakanaction cancelled or rescheduled many of their planned radio appearances, deciding not to directly promote the single at the remaining appearances. During these, the band preferred to focus on sending messages of hope for the victims of the disaster. In April, Yamaguchi visited Kesennuma and Minamisanriku in Miyagi Prefecture to help with the emergency relief, without a media presence. Yamaguchi made the decision to go to Miyagi after watching television segments on celebrities visiting the disaster zone, and feeling that the segments were too focused on celebrity camera opportunities, and did not show the genuine realities of those affected by the earthquake.

The earthquake made Yamaguchi rethink his reasons why Sakanaction make music. The meaning of a documentary-themed album changed after the earthquake, as the band felt as if they did not have a heavy album that reflected these events, then it could not truly be a documentary. Yamaguchi wrote the songs "Bach no Senritsu o Yoru ni Kiita Sei Desu" and "Years" directly after the earthquake, as therapy for himself. Realizing that rock bands were no longer a staple of Japanese charts in the early 2010s, Yamaguchi wanted to create a Sakanaction-style pop song that would resonate with a general pop audience, one that listened to idol groups such as Girls' Generation, TVXQ and AKB48. As rock music was no longer so prominent in Japan, Yamaguchi felt that the reasons for people listening to music had changed over time, and wanted to mix rock music with entertainment-focused music in order to give people music that they look for.

== Writing and production ==
=== Creation ===
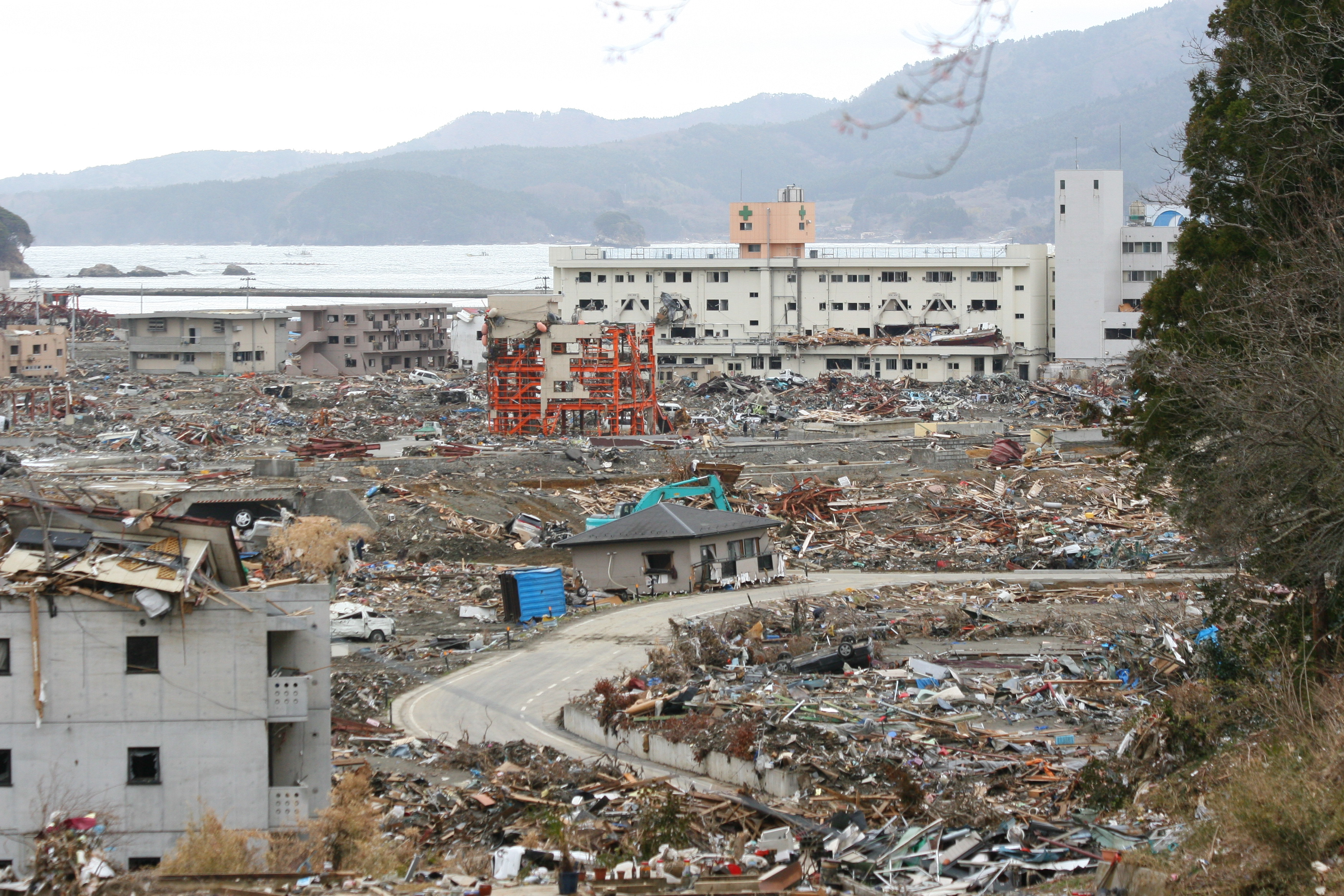
The album was inspired by the events of 2011, including the 2011 Tōhoku earthquake and tsunami (pictured: Minamisanriku, Miyagi in April 2011)

Though the early concept for the album was to show the band's reality and development in a chronological order, the earthquake made the band re-evaluate what they wanted to express with their documentary theme. Instead, the band decided to express what living in 2011 was like. Yamaguchi felt inspired to create music that when listened to strongly expressed the sentiments of a certain era, which he saw in the music of John Lennon, Bob Dylan and in Japanese singer Yōsui Inoue's song "Kasa ga Nai" (1972); as a way for people in the future to be able to experience how people felt during the post-earthquake era. In addition to the earthquake, Yamaguchi expressed other events that happened to him in 2011 through the albums's lyrics, including the death of electronic musician Rei Harakami in July 2011 which affected him deeply, as well as a turbulent event in his love life.

When writing the album's lyrics, Yamaguchi tried to express both the feelings that he had, and those that he saw were common in society in the early 2010s. He focused on questioning what the role of a musician was during this period; and attempted to represent the idea of certain types of people existing in 2011, making certain types of music. He believed that the true role of a musician had become strongly evident after the earthquake. The band also tried to express 2011 sonically, through the style of synths that pianist Emi Okazaki created for the songs.

The Documentaly album concept was created in January, after the song "Rookie" was written. "Endless" was first recorded after "Rookie", however was left uncompleted because Yamaguchi was not satisfied with the song. Yamaguchi spent eight months writing the song, recording the other compositions for the album in between working on "Endless". "Endless" became the most central song on the album for the band, with other songs arranged around "Endless" to complement it. The long writing process for "Endless" was frustrating for Yamaguchi, making him worried about if the documentary theme expressed itself well, and considered giving up on the theme.

As Yamaguchi spent much of his time focused on "Endless", he entrusted most of the album's arrangements to the other band members. This made Yamaguchi feel as if he was the director of the project, with drummer Keiichi Ejima leading the band as its captain during his absences as he focused on lyric writing. As Yamaguchi's workload was lessened, he noticed that Sakanaction were working together more like a genuine band on Documentaly. In addition to the band members, Yamaguchi felt that Sakanaction had gained a solid core of peripheral staff that helped with the recording process, compared to their previous albums.

Documentaly was officially announced for release on August 1, before the album had been entirely recorded. The band finished recording "Endless" on August 5, on the morning before the band's performance at the Rock in Japan Festival. Due to the song's protracted creation process, finally being able to finish the composition gave the band a sense of the album finally being complete. After recording the final song "Monochrome Tokyo", the album had finally finished being recorded in late August.

The band ordered the songs in a general chronological order for when each song was written, put into an order so that the listeners would understand Sakanaction as a band by the end of the album. When completed, Yamaguchi felt that Documentaly expressed what the band had come to understand while living in Tokyo. In contrast to Kikuuiki, which left him emotionally drained, he felt optimistic after completing Documentaly, feeling that he had a future in music. The Documentaly sessions led Yamaguchi to decide to live as a musician for a full-time career.

=== Song writing ===
"Endless"
Music critics praised the musical progression, beginning with a simple piano arrangement and gradually incorporating rock and electronic elements in "Endless".

"Document"
"Document", a song written by Yamaguchi in a single day, was described by critics as having a powerfully lingering impression who also saw the song as representing the entire album thematically.

Reflective of the documentary theme, Yamaguchi saw the album expressing the ups and downs of regular days, more so than previous albums. Despite the inspiration taken from the heavy events of the earthquake, Yamaguchi felt that because the album featured three singles that were tailored to be heard by a wide audience, which pushed the album into a brighter sound.

The first song written for the album, "Identity", was first written during the early demo sessions for Kikuuiki in 2009, in the same period when the band were experimenting on the song "Aruku Around" to develop a signature song with a recognizable Sakanaction sound. It was recorded directly after the band finished work on Kikuuiki, and had lyrics inspired by the band's song "Me ga Aku Aiiro", as well as how people create identities for themselves in society. "Holy Dance" was recorded in June 2010, inspired by Yamaguchi's frustrations of unable to go fishing.

The songs "Monochrome Tokyo" and "Kamen no Machi" were written about Yamaguchi's experiences of the chaos of living in Tokyo. "Monochrome Tokyo" was written in late 2010, around the same time that they were writing "Rookie". The song's demo originally began with the lyric Okazaki no ie no kāten wa dasai (岡崎の家のカーテンはダサい; "The curtains in Okazaki's house are old-fashioned") as a joke, referencing the band's video chat discussions.

"Ryūsen" was composed by Yamaguchi on the guitar, as a challenge to create a melody that would emphasize a song's instrumental. Yamaguchi stressed dynamism during the writing process, choosing a non-standard pop song structure for the piece. The song was recorded in a single live take. The audio from the take was then recorded onto a cassette tape and afterwards reconverted to digital sound, as a convention to add a deteriorated sound effect. "Ryūsen" and the instrumental track "Documentary" were arranged to complement "Endless", the song present between the two. Seeing releasing music as an act of self-expression, "Endless" was a song written by Yamaguchi to express his inner feelings as directly as possible. For this, Yamaguchi felt that he needed to develop new lyrical techniques to fully express his inner feelings, as these would not be expressed truly if he relied on techniques he had already developed. Eventually, he rewrote the song 74 times, creating a total of 78 different versions of the song lyrics. The instrumental piece "Documentary", which Yamaguchi felt linked to "Endless" due to its synth elements, was primarily created by Ejima, who had been creating instrumental songs for the band's albums as a way for him to learn about dance music. Yamaguchi saw the piece as more minimal than previous Sakanaction songs, and saw the song as a documentary of Ejima's increased skills as a music arranger.

"Bach no Senritsu o Yoru ni Kiita Sei Desu" and "Years" were written together directly after the 2011 Tōhoku earthquake and tsunami, as therapy for him after the earthquake. He wrote the songs as having a common theme spread across two works, hence featuring them on Documentaly in the same order as they had appeared on the "Bach no Senritsu o Yoru ni Kiita Sei Desu" single. "Bach no Senritsu o Yoru ni Kiita Sei Desu" is a song written focusing on everyday occurrences, while "Years" was focused on messages reacting to the "great anxiety" in society during the post-earthquake time in Japan. The final track on the album, "Document", was a song created to document the band's song creation process. The entire song was written and arranged in a single day, and fully recorded the following day. The lyrics were ad-libbed, a technique which Yamaguchi felt expressed a very personal side to himself, however made the lyrics more sarcastic and cynical than Sakanction's other songs. The song features the first ever instance in a Sakanaction song where Yamaguchi used the word ai (愛; "love") in his lyrics, something he sees as a natural response to seeing love as an everyday thing now.

=== Title ===
The album's title was officially confirmed on August 21. Originally the band planned on self-titling the album Sakanaction, as a reflection of the original theme of a documentary depicting themselves. The album was re-titled after the events of the earthquake, when the band felt that the event forced them to refocus the documentary theme around all of the events of 2011, instead of just themselves. The new title for the album, DocumentaLy [sic], is a pun on the words documentary and mental, with the letter 'l' capitalized. Yamaguchi, the creator of the title, felt that the title expressed the idea of bands living and making music in 2011, and saw the letters "r" and "l" as two letters that join together the word "real". The title is a recurring motif in the song titles of the album, including the instrumental track "DocumentaRy" (sic.), and the begging instrumental track "RL", which features both of the capitalised letters.

== Promotion and release ==
=== Album promotion ===
The band released the song "Bach no Senritsu o Yoru ni Kiita Sei Desu" as a single in July, two and a half months before the album's release. It was commercially successful, becoming certified gold by the Recording Industry Association of Japan for digital downloads, and reaching number four on the Billboard Japan Hot 100 chart. The song's music video, featuring a distinctive dance where Yamaguchi was laterally attached to four mannequins was well received in Japan, later winning the Best Video of the Year award at the 2012 Space Shower Music Video Awards. The band were featured in the September edition of Musica magazine, released on August 12, in a featured piece detailing the album's recording process.

The song "Endless" was used as the main promotional track for the album, and made its radio debut on August 31. In the week after Documentaly's release the song was the fourth most played song on Japanese radio for the week, making the song reach number eight on the Billboard Japan Hot 100. The song's music video, co-directed by Takumi Shiga and the band's long-time creative consultant Hisashi "Momo" Kitazawa, was unveiled on YouTube on the day of the album's release.

Documentaly was released on September 28 in three editions: a standard edition, a limited-edition version featuring a 52-page special booklet and a bonus track, "Holy Dance (Like a Live Mix)", and a more expensive limited-edition version featuring a DVD, on top of all of the additions on the other limited-edition version. The DVD featured Documentaly Documentary, a 27-minute documentary focused on the recording process of "Endless" and "Document".

On December 14, Sakanaction released Sakanarchive: 2007-2011: Sakanaction Music Video-shū, a DVD compiling the band's music videos since their debut in 2007, including all of the music videos released for songs from Documentaly. The collection featured a new music video for the Documentaly track "Document", which the band were inspired to make due to the documentary footage included on Documentaly's visual media disc, showcasing the recording of "Document". The video, depicting a female stalker in Yamaguchi's home played by singer-songwriter Kanae Hoshiba, was recorded in Yamaguchi's own home on November 6, after the band finished their concert at the Makuhari Messe in Chiba.

In May 2012, "Monochrome Tokyo" was featured on Tokyo Compi: Aoban, an album compiling songs thematically linked to Tokyo.

==== Performances and events ====
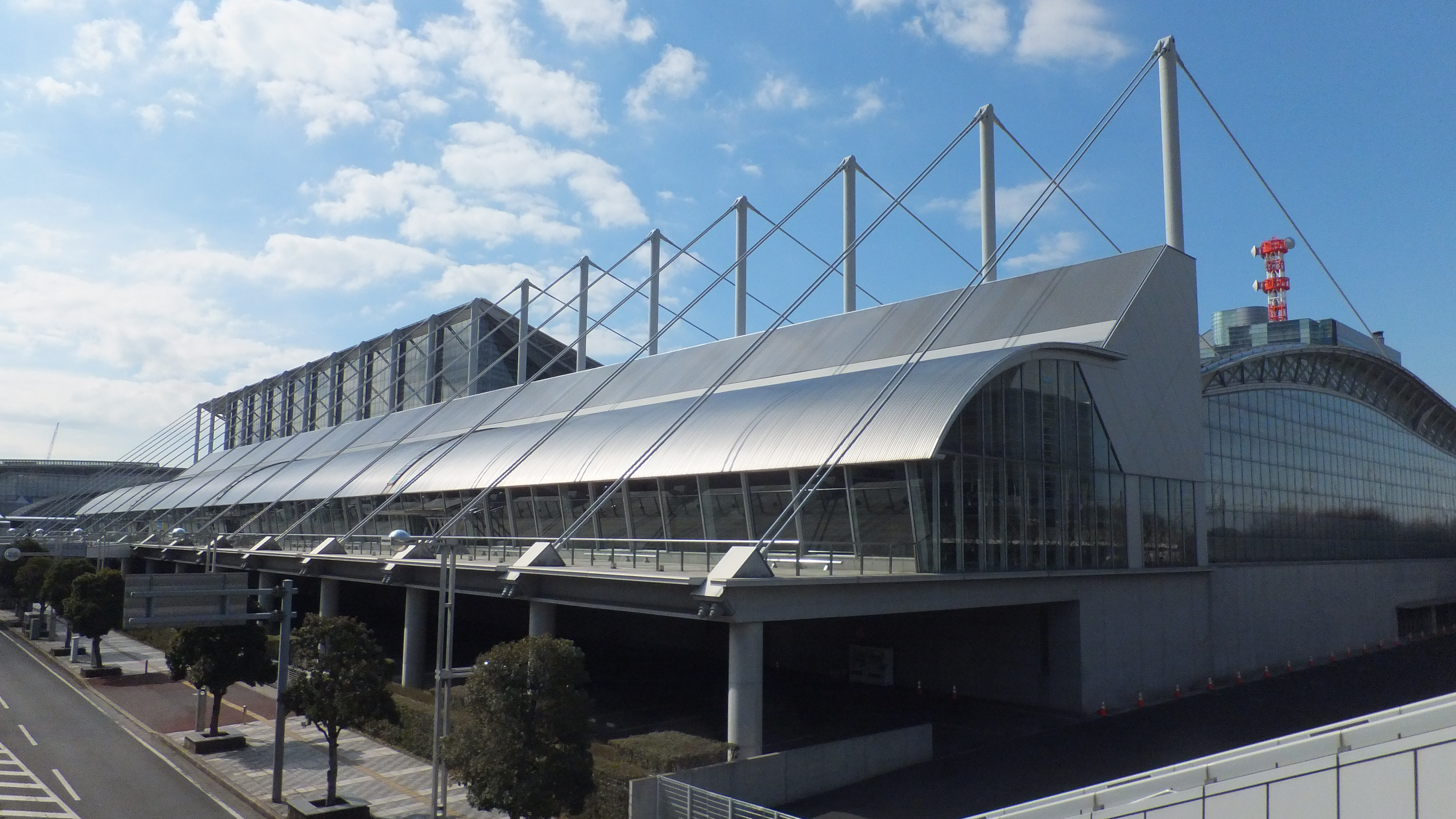
The band performed a tour across Japan, Sakanaquarium 2011, including a performance at the Makuhari Messe convention center (pictured).

In June, prior to the release of the single "Bach no Senritsu o Yoru ni Kiita Sei Desu", the band performed a six date tour of Japan's Zepp music halls, Sakanaquarium 2011: Zepp Alive. Before the album's release, the band performed at several of the major Japanese summer music festivals: the Rock in Japan Festival on August 5, World Happiness on August 7, the Rising Sun Rock Festival on August 13 and at Space Shower Love Shower on August 21. On September 8, 2011, Yamaguchi threw the ceremonial first pitch for the baseball match between the Yomiuri Giants and Chunichi Dragons. Musica organised a listening party for the album, held at Liquidroom Ebisu in Tokyo on September 23. The band toured the album from October to November with their Sakanaquarium 2011 tour, performing 15 dates at 13 venues in Japan, including the Zepp music halls and the Makuhari Messe convention center in Chiba.

Actor and singer Gen Hoshino held an event with Yamaguchi on December 15 to celebrate the release of both Documentaly and Hoshino's album Episode. The event was held at Tower Records Shibuya. On February 24, 2012, the band performed an overseas concert in Taipei, Taiwan. Both events were simultaneously broadcast on Ustream.

== Reception ==
=== Critical reception ===
Professional ratings
Review scores
Source	Rating
CDJournal	(favorable)
Excite Japan	(favorable)
Rolling Stone Japan	4/5 stars
Vibe	(favorable)

The album was well received by music critics in Japan. Yuya Shimizu of Rolling Stone Japan gave the album four out of five stars, praising how the album blended DFA Records-style dance rock and minimal techno with their Japanese pop sensibilities, and also noting Yamaguchi's oddness and lyrical sense. Kenta Eizumi of Vibe felt that Sakanaction expressed a strong sense of crisis happening in the contemporary Japanese music business on the album. By creating an album themed around documentaries, and giving the listener a chance to understand the entire creation process, Eizumi felt that Documentaly expressed the preciousness of music more so than other musical works. Looking at the album's central track "Endless", Shimizu felt that the song was an ambitious "compilation-like work", likening it to electronic musician Rei Harakami. CDJournal reviewers praised the "calm piano intro" that transitioned from the album's previous song "Ryūsen", and how the song progressed into "a Sakanaction-like electro and rock fusion sound". They praised Yamaguchi's lyrics, feeling they were "symbolic" and "like two recursive mirrors".

Naohisa Matsunaga of Excite felt that the album showed "the unfolding of a peculiarly intelligent and pop world", noting the album's "profound" band sound that adopted danceable electronic elements, as well as the "catchy and thrilling" sound progression. CDJournal called the album a "must listen disc", praising the increased skill of the "literary world" of Yamaguchi's lyrics, and the album's "fantasy-like nostalgia". They described "Monochrome Tokyo" as an "impressive rock number created by synthesizer and bass guitar riffs", praising the band's skill at removing musical elements as well as Yamaguchi's "emotionally sung" and "sexy" vocals. For "Antares to Hari", the reviewers felt that a "stylish jazz funk aroma" was created by a "relaxed" bass line and guitar cutting, and praised the light atmosphere created by the deep synths, while "Ryūsen"'s "comfortable" acoustic guitar "paints a dramatic and grand scene." They felt that the song managed to develop and increase in "temperature" without becoming noisy, and pointed to this as well as the "abstract" lyric "ryūsen, arata ni ryūsen" (流線 新たに流線; "streamline, a new streamline") as creating a "mysterious atmosphere". The reviewers likened "Kamen to Machi" to Japanese electronic band Yellow Magic Orchestra, and felt a sense of tension created by Yamaguchi's fast-tempo vocals and the changing background instrumental. They believed that the album's closing song "Document" was a condensation of the album's taste, and that the final lyric "ai no uta utatte mo ii kana tte omoihajimeteru" (愛の歌 歌ってもいいかなって想い始めてる; "I'm starting to think that it's okay to sing love songs") set to a "relaxed and hopeful sound" had a powerfully lingering impression.

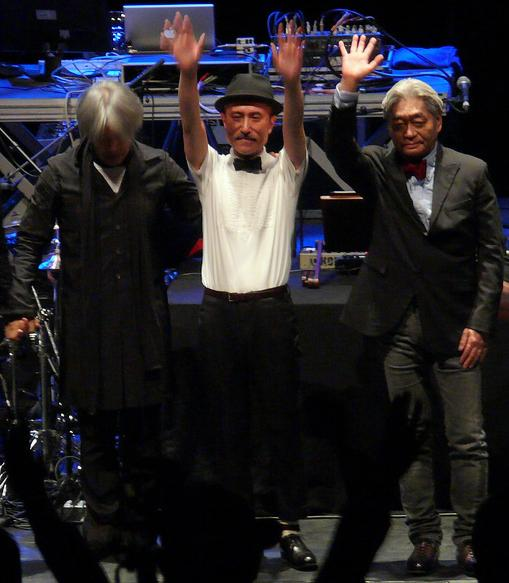
CDJournal critics likened the song "Kamen no Machi" to Japanese electronic band Yellow Magic Orchestra.

Reviewing the first single "Identity", CDJournal reviewers gave the single their star of approval, calling it the "highest [level of] pop music" and a future anthem for Sakanaction. They praised the "radical but considered electro sound" and the "danceable" four on the floor beat. They praised Yamaguchi's "unique" lyrical sense, as well as Yamaguchi's vocals at the start of the chorus as he sang the word dōshite, feeling it was "intense". Sumire Hanatsuka of Skream! felt that the song blended a Latin rhythm with the "spirits of a Japanese festival". For the song's B-side, featured as a bonus track on the album, reviewer Yuichi Hirayama described the song as "an electro tune demanding an escape from anguish", feeling that it had all of the "power" of "Identity" and the other band's singles. Reviewing the "Like a Live" remix found as the bonus track on Documentaly, CDJournal reviewers praised the song's "rhyme-like wordplay and exhilarating sound".

Critics praised the second single "Rookie" for its new style, not seen in previous Sakanaction works. The third single, "Bach no Senritsu o Yoru ni Kiita Sei Desu", was praised for its "ecstatic beat" and "elegant piano", and "smart dance music" sense. Dai Onojima of Rockin' On Japan felt the song felt simple compared to the busy arrangement of "Rookie", and that it was one of the band's songs most strongly structured as a pop song. Reviewing the single's B-side "Years", CDJournal felt that it was an "ambient-taste electro song that develops through its triple metre," and praised Yamaguchi's lyrics as "hopeful" and "poignant".

The album was one of thirteen prize-winning entries in the 2012 CD Shop Awards, an award chosen by music store staff across Japan, however the band lost the grand award to idol group Momoiro Clover Z's debut album Battle and Romance. iTunes Japan awarded Documentaly the best album of the year award at their annual iTunes Rewind 2011 awards, chosen from among the 100 most commercially successful albums on the platform.

=== Commercial reception ===
The album debuted at number two on Japan's Oricon albums chart underneath South Korean boyband TVXQ's Tone, selling 46,000 copies. Rival sales tracking agency SoundScan Japan found that the majority of copies sold in the first week were of the limited CD/DVD edition of the album, which accounted for 40,000 of the sold copies. The limited CD-only edition of the album accounted for 6,000 copies, while the standard edition did not sell enough copies to chart in the top 20 albums released that week. In its first month, the album was certified by the Recording Industry Association of Japan for over 100,000 copies of the album shipped to music stores across Japan. The album spent an additional five weeks in the top fifty, and continued to chart in the top 300 until February 2012. The album re-entered the top 300 from April to October 2012, and for a third chart-run from January to May 2013. In January 2014, the album re-entered the top 300 for a single week, bringing the total weeks on the chart to 62. In the album's chart run, it managed to sell a total of 103,000 copies.

== Track listing ==
All lyrics are written by Ichiro Yamaguchi.

No.	Title	Music	Length
1.	"RL"	Sakanaction	0:42
2.	"Identity" (アイデンティティ Aidentiti)	Yamaguchi	4:10
3.	"Monochrome Tokyo" (モノクロトウキョー Monokuro Tōkyō)	Yamaguchi	3:58
4.	"Rookie" (ルーキー Rūkī)	Yamaguchi	5:21
5.	"Antares to Hari" (アンタレスと針 Antaresu to Hari, "Antares and the Stinger")	Yamaguchi	4:02
6.	"Kamen no Machi" (仮面の街, "Mask Town")	Yamaguchi	3:35
7.	"Ryūsen" (流線, "Streamline Wave")	Yamaguchi	6:05
8.	"Endless" (エンドレス Endoresu)	Yamaguchi	3:47
9.	"Documentary"	Sakanaction	4:08
10.	"Bach no Senritsu o Yoru ni Kiita Sei Desu" (『バッハの旋律を夜に聴いたせいです。』, "It's Because of Listening to Bach Melodies at Night")	Yamaguchi	4:00
11.	"Years"	Yamaguchi	4:23
12.	"Document" (ドキュメント Dokyumento)	Yamaguchi	4:49
Total length:			49:00

Limited edition bonus track
No.	Title	Music	Length
13.	"Holy Dance (Like a Live Mix)" (ホーリーダンス Hōrī Dansu)	Yamaguchi	5:14
Total length:			54:15

DVD: Documentaly Documentary
No.	Title	Length
1.	"Endless"	21:46
2.	"Document"	5:26
Total length:		27:12

== Personnel ==
Personnel details were sourced from Documentaly's liner notes booklet.

Sakanaction

- All members – arrangement, production, composition (#1, #9)
- Keiichi Ejima – drums
- Motoharu Iwadera – guitar
- Ami Kusakari – bass guitar
- Emi Okazaki – keyboards
- Ichiro Yamaguchi – vocals, guitar, lyrics, composition (#2–8, #10–13)

Personnel and imagery

- Masahito Arai – video producer
- Yohei Hanyuda – DVD authoring engineer
- Daisuke Ishizaka – photography
- Minoru Iwabuchi – executive producer (Victor Entertainment)
- Jun Iwasaki – Documentaly Documentary director
- Kamikene – design, art direction
- Kotaro Kojima – mastering
- Hayato Kumaki – manager
- Kensuke Maeda – assistant engineer for Alive Recording Studio
- Tatsuya Nomura – A&R producer (Hip Land Music Corporation)
- Aki Okiyama – coordination
- Masaki Shinozuka – Documentaly Documentary producer
- Yuchiro Soshi – coordination
- Yoriko Sugimoto – A&R director
- Satoshi Tajima – executive producer (Hip Land Music Corporation)
- Masashi Uramoto – mixing, recording
- Wataru Woka – sales promoter
- Satoshi Yamagami – A&R promoter
- Naoki Yokota – executive producer (Victor Entertainment)

== Charts ==
Charts	Peak position
Japan Billboard Top Albums Sales	2
Japan Oricon weekly albums	2
Japan Oricon monthly albums	4
Japan Oricon yearly albums	81

=== Sales and certifications ===
Chart	Amount
Oricon physical sales	102,000
RIAJ physical certification	Gold (100,000+)

== Release history ==
Region	Date	Format	Distributing Label	Catalogue codes
Japan	September 28, 2011	CD, CD/DVD, digital download	Victor Entertainment	VICL-63785, VIZL-437
Taiwan	November 8, 2011	CD	Rock Records	GUT2364.4
South Korea	January 17, 2012	digital download	J-Box Entertainment	—N/a
Japan	March 18, 2015	lossless digital download	Victor	VEAHD-10618
Japan	August 5, 2015	LP record	Victor	VIJL-60153~4
