= April discography =

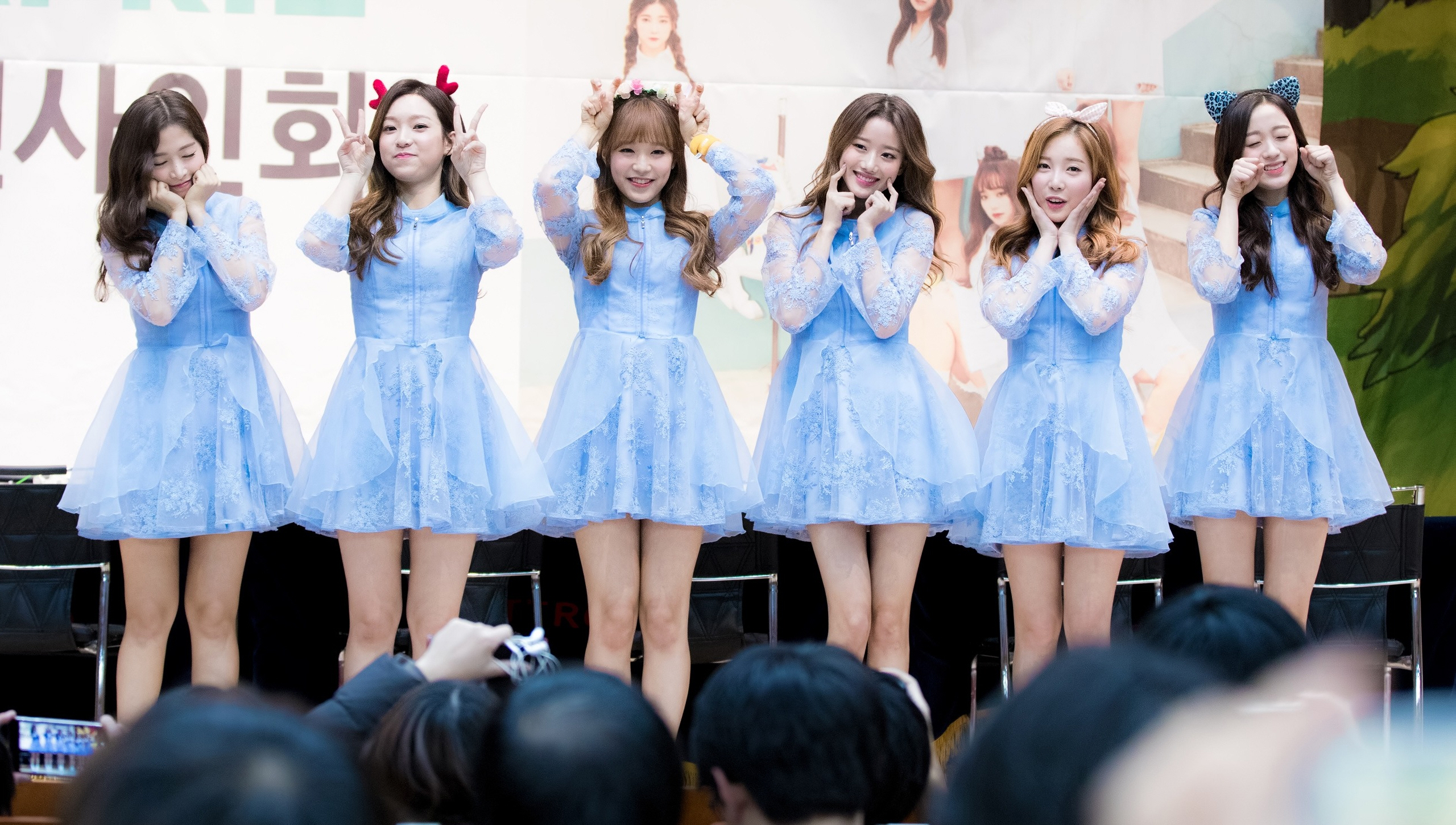
- April during a fan-sign, on January 15, 2017.
- EPs: 7
- Soundtrack albums: 5
- Singles: 11
- Music videos: 12
- Single albums: 4

The discography of the South Korean girl group April consists of seven extended plays, four single albums, and eleven singles. APRIL was formed by DSP Media in 2015, and is currently composed of six members: Chaekyung, Chaewon, Naeun, Yena, Rachel and Jinsol.

The group's debut extended play, Dreaming was released on August 24, 2015 along with the lead single, "Dream Candy" . The group made its Japanese debut on April 25, 2018, with the Japanese version of their 2016 single "Tinkerbell".

== Albums ==
=== Single albums ===
List of single albums, with selected details, chart positions, and sales
Title	Album details	Peak chart positions	Sales
Title	Album details	KOR	Sales
Boing Boing	Released: November 25, 2015; Label: DSP Media; Formats: CD, digital download	13	KOR: 3,803
Snowman	Released: December 21, 2015; Label: DSP Media; Formats: CD, digital download	14	KOR: 3,483
Mayday	Released: May 29, 2017; Label: DSP Media; Formats: CD, digital download	9	KOR: 7,250
Hello Summer	Released: July 29, 2020; Label: DSP Media; Formats: CD, digital download	6	KOR: 14,408

=== Extended plays ===
List of extended plays, with selected details, chart positions, and sales
Title	Album details	Peak chart positions	Sales
Title	Album details	KOR	Sales
Dreaming	Released: August 24, 2015; Label: DSP Media; Format: CD, digital download	8	KOR: 2,542
Spring	Released: April 27, 2016; Label: DSP Media; Format: CD, digital download	12	KOR: 4,919
Prelude	Released: January 3, 2017; Label: DSP Media; Format: CD, digital download	14	KOR: 8,086
Eternity	Released: September 20, 2017; Label: DSP Media; Format: CD, digital download	7	KOR: 7,398
The Blue	Released: March 12, 2018; Label: DSP Media; Format: CD, digital download	11	KOR: 7,162
The Ruby	Released: October 16, 2018; Label: DSP Media; Format: CD, digital download	10	KOR: 7,070
Da Capo	Released: April 22, 2020; Label: DSP Media; Format: CD, digital download	5	KOR: 12,104

== Singles ==
List of singles, with selected chart positions, showing year released, sales, and album name
Title	Year	Peak chart positions				Sales (Note: Sales figures for tracks are based on digital downloads, except where noted.)	Album
Title	Year	KOR	KOR Hot	JPN	JPN Hot	Sales	Album
"Dream Candy" (꿈사탕)	2015	77	—N/a	—	—	KOR: 51,402	Dreaming
"Muah!"	2015	134	—N/a	—	—	KOR: 14,055	Boing Boing
"Snowman"	2015	140	—N/a	—	—	KOR: 12,226	Snowman
"Tinker Bell" (팅커벨) (Note: "Tinker Bell (Japanese version)" was released on April 25, 2018 as April's debut Japanese single.)	2016	136	—N/a	29	90	KOR: 24,893; JPN: 3,438 (Phy.)	Spring
"April Story" (봄의 나라 이야기)	2017	62	—N/a	—	—	KOR: 62,943	Prelude
"Mayday"	2017	— (Note: "Mayday" did not enter the Gaon Digital chart top 100, but peaked at no. 97 on Gaon Download chart (Domestic).)	97	—	—	KOR: 18,903	Mayday
"Take My Hand" (손을 잡아줘)	2017	— (Note: "Take My Hand" did not enter the Gaon Digital chart top 100, but peaked at no. 97 on Download component chart (Domestic).)	—	—	—	KOR: 16,517	Eternity
"The Blue Bird" (파랑새)	2018	— (Note: "The Blue Bird" did not enter the Gaon Digital chart top 100, but peaked at no. 50 on Download component chart.)	—	—	—	—N/a	The Blue
"Oh! My Mistake" (예쁜 게 죄)	2018	— (Note: "Oh! My Mistake" did not enter the Gaon Digital chart top 100, but peaked at no. 71 on Download component chart.)	—	—	—	—N/a	The Ruby
"Oh-E-Oh"	2019	—	—	20	—	JPN: 2,508 (Phy.)	Non-album single
"Lalalilala"	2020	40	17	—	—	—N/a	Da Capo
"Now or Never"	2020	117	69	—	—	—N/a	Hello Summer
"—" denotes releases that did not chart or were not released in that region.

=== Promotional singles ===
Title	Year	Album
"The Love of Fingertips" (손끝의 사랑) (with Various Artists)	2016	Non-album single
"So You" (이렇게 너)	2017	Non-album single

== Soundtrack appearances ==
Title	Year	Album
"I Like You" (네가 좋아)	2018	Dear My Room OST
"Magic Dream"	2019	My Strange Hero OST
"Feeling"	2019	Extraordinary You OST
"Crazy"	2020	Backstreet Rookie OST
"Falling In Love"	2020	Do Do Sol Sol La La Sol OST

== Other album appearances ==
Title	Year	Album
"Love with Me!" (나랑 사랑해!)	2020	KB Digital Compilation : EASY SOUND

== Other charted songs ==
Title	Year	Peak chart positions	Sales (Note: Korean single section is a download sales only by Gaon Music Chart)	Album
Title	Year	KOR	Sales	Album
"M.F.B.F." (내 미래의 남자친구에게)	2016	— (Note: "M.F.B.F" did not enter the Gaon Digital chart top 100, but peaked at no. 389 on Download component chart (Domestic).)	KOR: 3,069+	Spring

== Videography ==
=== Music videos ===
Title	Year	Director(s)	Ref.
Korean
"Dream Candy"	2015	Oroshi (Digipedi)	
"Muah!"	2015	Hong Won-ki (Zanybros)	
"Snowman"	2015	Hong Won-ki (Zanybros)	
"Tinkerbell"	2016	Hong Won-ki (Zanybros)	
"April Story"	2017	Kim Young-jo & Yoo Seung-woo (Naive Creative Production)	
"Lovesick"	2017	Park Jin-young	
"Mayday"	2017	Kim Young-jo & Yoo Seung-woo (Naive Creative Production)	
"Take My Hand"	2017	Hong Won-ki (Zanybros)	
"The Blue Bird"	2018	Kim Young-jo & Yoo Seung-woo (Naive Creative Production)	
"Oh! My Mistake"	2018	Jimmy (VIA)	
"LALALILALA"	2020	Jimmy (VIA)	
"Love with Me!"	2020	—N/a	
"Now or Never"	2020	—N/a	
Japanese
"Tinkerbell"	2018	Daesung Media	
"Oh-e-Oh"	2019	Kim Young-jin	
