= Eternity (disambiguation) =

Eternity is a term in philosophy referring to the idea of forever or to timelessness.

Eternity may also refer to:

== Comics ==
- Eternity (Marvel Comics), a fictional cosmic entity in Marvel Comics
- Eternity Comics, an imprint of Malibu Comics
- Kid Eternity, a superhero in Quality Comics and DC Comics

== Literature ==
- Eternity (novel), a 1988 novel by Greg Bear
- Eternity, an organization in the 1955 Isaac Asimov novel The End of Eternity

== Magazines ==
- Eternity (magazine), a defunct American Christian magazine
- Eternity (newspaper), an Australian Christian newspaper founded in 2009
- Eternity SF, a 1970s American science fiction magazine

== Film and television ==
- Eternity (1943 film), a controversial Mandarin-language film made in Japanese-occupied China
- Eternity (1990 film), an American drama film starring Jon Voight
- Eternity (2010 Thai film), an erotic romance drama film starring Ananda Everingham and Chermarn Boonyasak
- Eternity (2010 South African film), a horror film featuring vampires at war
- Eternity (2013 film), a New Zealand science fiction mystery film directed by Alex Galvin
- Eternity: The Movie, a 2014 American comedy-drama film featuring a two-man band in the 1980s
- Eternity (2016 film), a French-language historical drama film directed by Tran Anh Hung
- Eternity (2017 film), a Peruvian Aymara-language drama film directed by Óscar Catacora
- Eternity (2025 film), an American romantic comedy film starring Miles Teller, Elizabeth Olsen, and Callum Turner
- "Eternity" (Angel), a 2000 episode of the television show Angel
- Eternity, a 1993 TV drama, starring Faye Wong

== Music ==
=== Performers ===
- Eternity∞, a side-project by Jade Valerie and Roberto "Geo" Rosan, also an album by the group
- Eternity (group), a South Korean virtual band

=== Albums ===
- Eternity (A Wake in Providence album), 2022
- Eternity (Alice Coltrane album), 1975
- Eternity (Amplifier EP), 2008
- Eternity (Anathema album), and the three-part title song
- Eternity (April EP), 2017
- Eternity (DJ Heavygrinder), 2008 album
- Eternity (Every Little Thing album), 2000
- Eternity (Freedom Call album), 2002
- Eternity (Kamelot album), and the title song
- Eternity (Kangta album), and the title song
- Eternity (Michael Learns to Rock album), and the title song
- Eternity (Tina Guo album), 2013
- Eternity: Best of 93 – 98, by Takara

=== Songs ===
- "Eternity" (Alex Warren song), 2025
- "Eternity" (Alibi song), 2000
- Eternity (Cimberly song), 2026
- "Eternity" (Robbie Williams song), 2001
- "Eternity", a song by Ian Gillan from the video game 2006 Blue Dragon
- "Eternity" (VIXX song), 2014
- "Eternity", a 1969 single by Vikki Carr
- "Eternity", by capsule from the album Flash Back
- "Eternity", by Dark Moor from the album Dark Moor
- "Eternity", by Dreams Come True from the soundtrack for the film The Swan Princess
- "Eternity", by Jolin Tsai from the album Don't Stop
- "Eternity", by Jonas Brothers from the album Flesh Gordon
- "Eternity" by Neil Young and Crazy Horse from the album Colorado
- "Eternity", by Paul van Dyk featuring Adam Young from the album Evolution
- "Eternity", by Sheena Easton from the album No Sound But a Heart
- "Eternity", by Stratovarius from the album Episode
- "Eternity", by Your Memorial from the album Redirect
- "Eternity", by Zerobaseone from the extended play Cinema Paradise

== Other ==
- Eternity (drug), a nickname for the psychoactive drug 2CE-5-EtO
- Eternity (graffito), a word chalked by Arthur Stace around Sydney, Australia, from the 1940s to the 1960s
- Eternity (fragrance), a Calvin Klein fragrance
- Eternity puzzle, a puzzle game
- Pillars of Eternity, a fantasy role-playing video game
- Eternity Range
- Eternity clause, a clause intended to ensure that the law or constitution cannot be changed by amendment
- Eternity Larva, a fictional character from the video game Hidden Star in Four Seasons in the Touhou Project series

== See also ==
- Into Eternity (disambiguation)
- Eternal (disambiguation)
- Eternalism (disambiguation)
- Walang Hanggan (disambiguation)
- Forever (disambiguation)
- Timeless (disambiguation)
