= Lee Na-eun =

South Korean actress (born 1999)

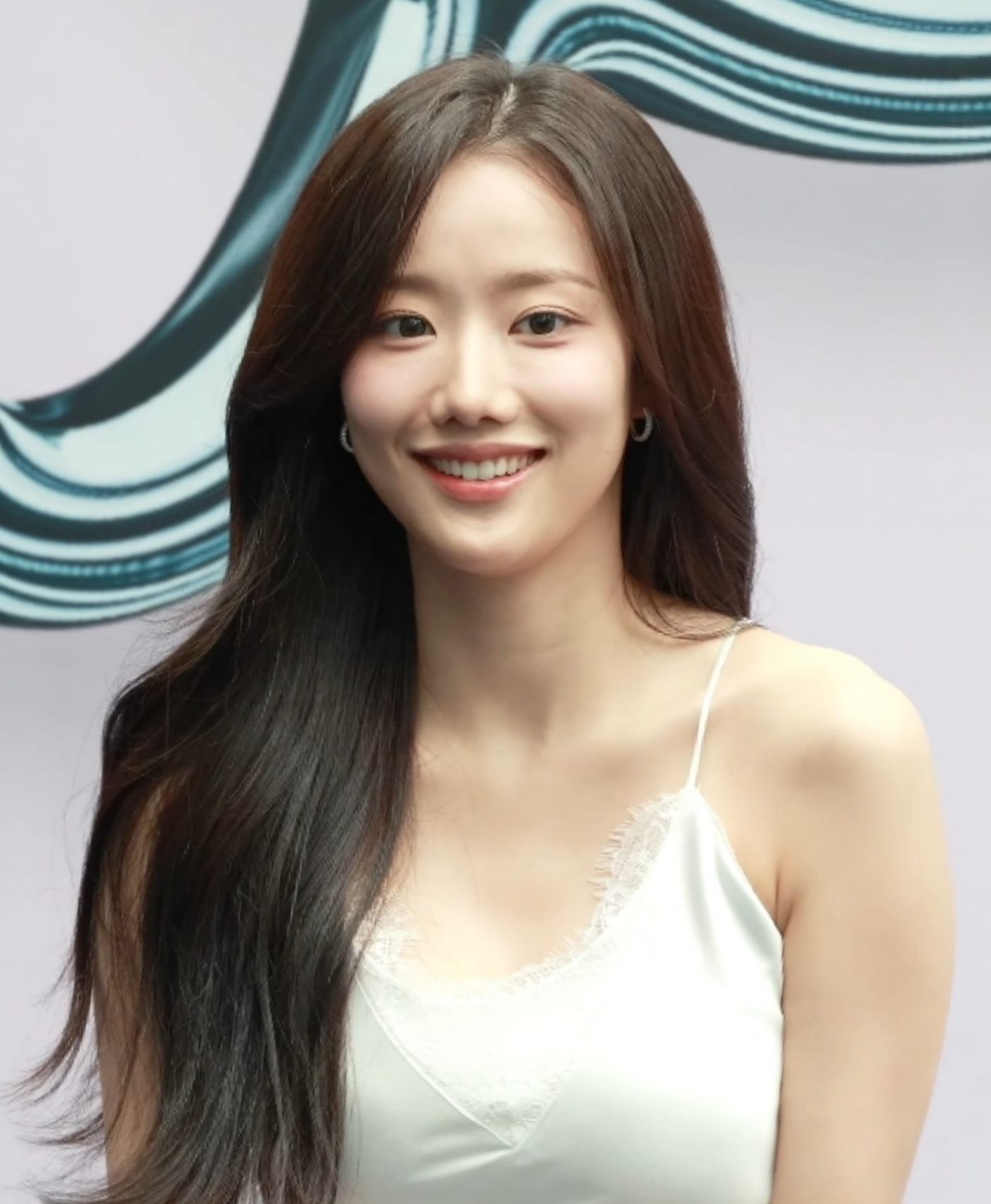
- Lee in September 2024
- Born: May 5, 1999 (age 27); Cheongju, South Korea
- Education: School of Performing Arts Seoul
- Occupations: Actress; model; singer
- Years active: 2015–present
- Agents: Namoo Actors (South Korea); HIAN (Japan)
- Musical career
- Genre: K-pop
- Instrument: Vocals
- Years active: 2015–2022
- Label: DSP
- Formerly of: April

Korean name
- Hangul: 이나은
- Hanja: 李娜恩
- RR: I Naeun
- MR: I Naŭn

Lee Na-eun (Korean: 이나은; born May 5, 1999), also known mononymously as Naeun, is a South Korean actress, model and singer. She is a former member of the South Korean girl group April, formed by DSP Media in 2015. She is best known for her roles in television series A-Teen (2018), A-Teen 2 (2019) and Extraordinary You (2019).

== Early life and education ==
Lee was born on May 5, 1999, in Cheongju, South Korea. She attended School of Performing Arts Seoul and graduated in February 2018.

== Career ==
=== 2015–2022: Debut with April and acting career ===
Lee was first introduced as a member of April by DSP Media on July 22, 2015. The group debuted on August 24 with the EP Dreaming and the title track "Dream Candy" (Korean: 꿈사탕). Lee made her official acting debut in the VR web drama "April Love" in 2016. She also made a minor appearance in KBS2's My Father Is Strange in 2017.

On February 1, 2018, Lee alongside April bandmate Lee Jin-sol collaborated in their digital single track "My Story" which was released on February 7. On May 2, 2018, Lee alongside bandmate Lee Jin-sol released their 2nd collaboration track "Stars In The Night Sky" for SBS TV television series Switch. The same year, Lee was cast in the teen drama A-Teen (2018) and the second season of the series in 2019. Lee also starred in MBC's school fantasy drama Extraordinary You, based on the hit Daum webtoon July Found by Chance. From October 2019 to February 2021, she hosted Inkigayo alongside Jaehyun of NCT and Minhyuk of Monsta X.

On March 1, 2020, Lee and bandmate Lee Jin-sol released their 3rd collaboration song "Matter of Time" as part of seventh extended play Da Capo. On June 19, Lee was featured in Ravi's Paradise EP with the title track "Rain Drop". On November 8, Lee and Eric Nam released the duet "Attraction" as part of the soundtrack for Daum's webtoon Bunny & The Boys. Twelve days later, Lee was confirmed to star in Taxi Driver. However on March 8, 2021, Lee officially left the cast following Lee Hyun-joo's bullying accusations made against her. About 60% of the filming was completed on March 8, 2021. Lee Na-eun's scenes were removed.

On January 28, 2022, DSP Media announced April's disbandment. On June 2, Lee her signed a contract with Namoo Actors and officially announced, that she will promote as an actress.

=== 2022–present: Return to acting ===
On November 16, 2023, Lee made her special appearance in Flex X Cop, played a role as a celebrity. On January 31, 2024, Lee returns full-fledged acting in the action thriller series The Defects, which confirmed on July 18, 2025. On February 22, Lee also made a special appearance as a victim in the crime investigation drama Crash. On February 28, 2025, Lee launched her own YouTube channel. On April 25, Lee signed a contract with HIAN for activities in Japan and became selected as a exclusive model for Kobunsha's JJ magazine to commemorate its 50th anniversary. On September 22, Lee, alongside A-Teen 2 co-star Choi Bo-min, would be reunite in a short-form drama My Little Chef. In July 2026, Lee would be making her stage debut in the play Closer as Alice, with Jeon Sung-min and So Joo-yeon.

== Discography ==
=== Singles ===
Title	Year	Peak chart position		Album
Title	Year	KOR		Album
Title	Year	Circle	Hot	Album
As featured artist
"Rain Drop" (비♡) (Ravi featuring Lee Na-eun)	2020	— (Note: "Rain Drop" did not enter the Gaon Digital Chart, but peaked at number 71 and 122 on the Gaon BGM Chart and the Gaon Download Chart, respectively.)	91	Paradise
Collaborations
"My Story" (내 이야기) (with Jinsol of April)	2018	—	—	Non-album single
"Matter of Time" (시간차) (with Jinsol of April)	2020	— (Note: "Matter of Time" did not enter the Gaon Digital Chart, but peaked at number 78 on the Gaon BGM Chart.)	—	Da Capo
Soundtrack appearances
"Stars In The Night Sky" (밤하늘 별) (with Jinsol of April)	2018	—	—	Switch OST Part 5
"Attraction" (끌림) (with Eric Nam)	2020	— (Note: "Attraction" did not enter the Gaon Digital Chart, but peaked at number 33 and 65 on the Gaon BGM Chart and the Gaon Download Chart, respectively.)	—	Bunny & The Boys OST
"—" denotes releases that did not chart or were not released in that region.

== Filmography ==
=== Television series ===
Year	Title	Role	Notes	Ref.
2017	My Father Is Strange	Drama staff	Cameo (episode 24)	
2017–2018	Modulove	Herself		
2019	Hip Hop King – Nassna Street	Song Ha-jin		
2019	Extraordinary You	Yeo Joo-da		
2024	Flex X Cop	Han Yu-ra	Cameo (episode 6, 9–10)	
2024	Crash	Kim Min-ju	Cameo (episode 4)	
2025	The Defects	So-mi		

=== Web series ===
Year	Title	Role	Notes	Ref.
2018	A-Teen	Kim Ha-na		
2019	A-Teen 2	Kim Ha-na		
2019	I Have a Secret	Kim Ha-na	Cameo	
2020	Twenty Twenty	Kim Ha-na	Cameo	
2026	My Little Chef	Choi No-ma	Short-form drama	

=== Television shows ===
Year	Title	Role	Ref.
2017	I Am An Actor	Contestant	
2018–2019	One Night of Entertainment	Reporter	
2019	High School Lunch Cook-off	Host	
2019–2021	Inkigayo	Host	
2020	Get it Beauty 2020	Main MC	
2020	My Dream Is Ryan	Student teacher	
2020	School Meal Restaurant	Host	
2020	2020 SBS Gayo Daejeon	Host	

=== Radio shows ===
Year	Title	Role	Ref.
2020–2021	Avengirls	Friday host	

=== Music video appearances ===
Year	Title	Artist	Ref.
2014	"Stop stop it"	Got7	
2019	"Vacance in September"	Kim Jae-hwan and Stella Jang	

== Theater ==
Year	Title	Role	Notes
2026	Closer	Alice	with Jeon Sung-min and So Joo-yeon

== Ambassadorship ==
- 22nd Bucheon International Animation Festival (2020)

== Awards and nominations ==
Award	Year	Category	Nominated work	Result	Ref.
Brand of the Year Awards	2020	Female Acting Idol of the Year	—N/a	Won	
MBC Drama Awards	2019	Best New Actress	Extraordinary You	Nominated	
V Live Awards	2019	Favorite Web Series Actress	A-Teen 2	Won	
