= Timeless =

Timeless or timelessness may refer to:

- Eternity, timeless existence or infinite duration
- Immortality, everlasting life not limited by time

== Arts ==
=== Film and television ===
- Timeless (film), a 2016 German film
- Timeless (American TV series), a 2016–2018 science fiction series
- Timeless (Philippine TV series) or Sana'y Wala Nang Wakas, a 2003–2004 drama series
- Timeless (Vietnamese TV series), 2024–2025
- Barbra Streisand: Timeless, a 2001 television special by Barbra Streisand
- "Timeless" (The Flash), a 2021 television episode
- "Timeless" (Star Trek: Voyager), a 1998 television episode

=== Literature ===
- Timeless (Carriger novel), a 2012 novel by Gail Carriger
- Timeless (Cole novel), a 2003 Doctor Who novel by Stephen Cole
- Timeless (Monir novel), a 2011 novel by Alexandra Monir

=== Music ===
- Timeless Records, a Dutch jazz record label
- Timeless Festival, in Huddersfield, England; 2002–2005

==== Albums ====
- Timeless (Bobby Vinton album), 1989
- Timeless (Chuck Brown album), 1998
- Timeless (Dallas Smith album), 2020
- Timeless (Davido album), 2023
- Timeless (Diane Schuur album), 1986
- Timeless (Eric Martin album), originally Mr. Vocalist 2, 2009
- Timeless (Goldie album) or the title song, 1995
- Timeless (Il Divo album), 2018
- Timeless (Isley Brothers album), 1978
- Timeless (Jim Ankan Deka album), 2012
- Timeless (John Abercrombie album) or the title song, 1975
- Timeless (Kaytranada album), 2024
- Timeless (Kenny Lattimore album), 2008
- Timeless (Khalil Fong album), 2009
- Timeless (Martina McBride album), 2005
- Timeless (Meghan Trainor album), 2024
- Timeless (N-Dubz album), 2023
- Timeless (Onewe album), 2022
- Timeless (Piolo Pascual album), 2007
- Timeless (Prince album), 2026
- Timeless (Sarah Brightman album), 1997
- Timeless (Sérgio Mendes album) or the title song, 2006
- Timeless (Ungu album), 2012
- Timeless (Uverworld album), 2006
- Timeless (Wet Wet Wet album), 2007
- Timeless, Live at the Velvet Lounge, by Fred Anderson, 2006
- Timeless: Live in Concert, by Barbra Streisand, 2000
- Timeless: The All-Time Greatest Hits, by the Bee Gees, 2017
- Timeless: The Classics, by Michael Bolton, 1992
- Timeless: The Classics Vol. 2, by Michael Bolton, 1999
- Timeless, by After 7, 2016
- Timeless, by Cormac De Barra and Moya Brennan, 2019
- Timeless, by Home Free, 2017
- Timeless, by Jami Sieber, 2013
- Timeless, by Jeff Sipe, 2006
- Timeless, by the Quebe Sisters, 2007
- Timeless, by Shirley Brown, 1991
- Timeless: Songs of a Century, by Michelle Creber, 2012
- Timeless – Wendy Moten sings Richard Whiting, by Wendy Moten, 2014
- Timeless...The Musical Legacy, by Badfinger, 2013

==== EPs ====
- Timeless (Of Mice & Men EP) or the title song, 2021
- Timeless, by Ron Browz, 2009
- Timeless, by the Swon Brothers, 2016

==== Songs ====
- "Timeless" (A Boogie wit da Hoodie song), 2016
- "Timeless" (Dallas Smith song), 2019
- "Timeless" (Queensberry song), 2012
- "Timeless" (Reece Mastin song), 2013
- "Timeless" (The Weeknd and Playboi Carti song), 2024
- "Timeless" (Zhang Liyin song), 2006
- "Timeless", by Badfinger from Ass, 1973
- "Timeless", by Benny the Butcher from Burden of Proof, 2020
- "Timeless", by DMA's from Hills End, 2016
- "Timeless", by In Flames from Subterranean, 1994
- "Timeless", by Make Them Suffer from Old Souls, 2015
- "Timeless", by NCT from NCT 2018 Empathy, 2018
- "Timeless", by Of Mice & Men from Echo, 2021
- "Timeless", by Pestilence from Hadeon, 2018
- "Timeless", by Rob Thomas from Chip Tooth Smile, 2019
- "Timeless", by Taeyeon from INVU, 2022
- "Timeless", by Taylor Swift from Speak Now (Taylor's Version), 2023
- "Timeless", by Textures from Phenotype, 2016
- "Timeless", by UNVS, 2020

=== Tours ===
- Timeless (Barbra Streisand tour), 2000
- Timeless (Mylène Farmer tour), 2013
- Timeless (Bert Nievera), a 1990–2002 concert series by Bert Nievera

=== Other ===
- Timeless (radio network), a defunct American satellite music service
- Timeless Media Group, an American home entertainment company

== Science ==
- Timeless (gene), a gene in Drosophila
- Timelessness, in canonical quantum gravity, a property of the Wheeler–DeWitt equation

== Sports ==
- Timeless Test, a type of cricket match

== See also ==
- Eternity (disambiguation)
