= Lee Hyun-joo (actress) =

South Korean actress (born 1998)

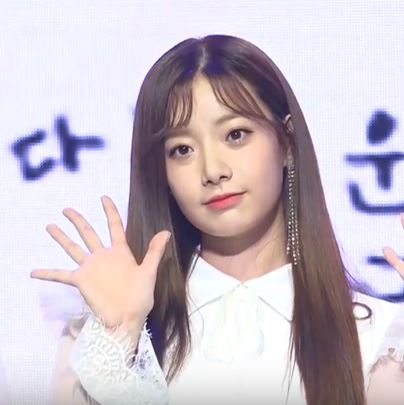
- Lee in March 2018
- Born: February 5, 1998 (age 28); Seoul, South Korea
- Occupations: Actress; singer
- Years active: 2015–present
- Agent: Studio 1592
- Musical career
- Genres: K-pop; dance pop
- Instrument: Vocals
- Years active: 2015–2018
- Label: DSP
- Formerly of: April; Uni.T

Korean name
- Hangul: 이현주
- Hanja: 李玹珠
- RR: I Hyeonju
- MR: I Hyŏnju

Lee Hyun-joo (Korean: 이현주; born February 5, 1998), is a South Korean actress and singer. She is a former member of girl group April. Following her departure from the group, she participated in the KBS2's survival show The Unit and finished in fifth place, making her debut as a member of project girl group Uni.T in 2018. She is known for her roles in Love Distance 2, The Witch Store and Love, Can You Deliver Today.

== Career ==
=== 2015–2016: April and acting career ===
Lee Hyun-joo debuted as a member of April with the debut album Dreaming. After their second album Spring, she went on hiatus to focus on her health, and by October, she had announced her withdrawal from her group to pursue an acting career while dealing with her health issues.

In 2016, she made her acting debut with the starring television series Momin's Room as the role of Lee Moda.

=== 2017–present: The Unit, UNI.T and return to acting ===
In 2017, she joined the reality television survival series The Unit, and on May 18, 2018, she won 5th place, securing her spot in the temporary girl group, Uni.T with the group's debut EP Line.

On October 12, 2018, Uni.T disbanded after five months of promoting. Lee subsequently continued as an actress and returned to her agency.

=== Bullying allegations controversy ===
On February 28, 2021, a post was made to an online forum by someone claiming to be Lee's brother. In the post, he claimed that Lee's departure from April had not been because she wanted to study acting, but because she had been forced out due to being severely bullied by the other members, at one point even attempting suicide. DSP Media has denied that any bullying took place, and announced they would be pursuing legal action against Lee and her family. As a result, April faced heavy backlash, up to and including having members removed from endorsement deals and acting roles. Lee then posted a statement on her personal Instagram on April 18, 2021, backing the claims of the two netizens who made the accusations. She also stated that the label, DSP Media, was not allowing her to terminate her exclusive contract with them. The group April subsequently disbanded.

== Endorsements ==
On July 29, 2021, Lee was selected as the new model for cosmetic brand LOAR.

== Discography ==
=== Soundtrack appearances ===
List of soundtrack appearances, showing year released, selected chart positions and album name
Title	Year	Album
"Color"	2024	I Like It the Way It Is OST
"It'll be Okay"	2024	I Like It the Way It Is OST

== Filmography ==
=== Film ===
Year	Title	Role	Ref.
2024	I Like It the Way It Is	Jo-ah	

=== Television series ===
Year	Title	Role	Ref.
2016	Momin's Room	Lee Moda	
2017	My Father Is Strange	Hyeon-ju	
2020	Hanging On	Il Deung-yi	

=== Web series ===
Year	Title	Role	Notes	Ref.
2018	Our Neighborhood	Ki yun-ji		
2019	Love Distance 2	Ha-young		
2019	The Witch Store	Yoo Young-ji		
2019	Love, Can You Deliver Today	Yoon Hye-joo		
2020	Goedam	Ji See-hee		
2020	Legally, Dad	Kim Ah-young		
2020	Touch Me if You Can	Yoon Ah-ri		
2020	The Colors of Our Time	Yu-ra		
2021	Exciting Broadcasting Accident	Han Yu-ra		
2021	College Life That Everyone Wants	Green		
2021	Summer Boys	Hyun-ju	Cameo (ep. 10)	
2023	It Was Spring	Baek Il-rak		

=== Television shows ===
Year	Title	Role	Ref.
2015	April's On Airpril: Season 1	Regular member	
2017	The Unit	Contestant	
2018	THE UNI+ Special Show	Regular member	
2018	UNI.TV	Regular member	
2019	Creator Campus	Regular member	
