= Extraordinary You =

2019 South Korean television series

- Promotional poster
- Also known as: July Found by Chance; Suddenly One Day
- Hangul: 어쩌다 발견한 하루
- Lit.: Ha-ru Found by Chance
- RR: Eojjeoda balgyeonhan Haru
- MR: Ŏtchŏda palgyŏnhan Haru
- Genre: Fantasy; Romance; Comedy
- Based on: July Found by Chance by Moo Ryuyee
- Developed by: Kim Dae-jin
- Written by: In Ji-hye; Song Ha-young
- Directed by: Kim Sang-hyeop
- Starring: Kim Hye-yoon; Rowoon; Lee Jae-wook; Lee Na-eun; Jung Gun-joo; Kim Young-dae; Lee Tae-ri
- Opening theme: "Walk This Sky" by Park Se-joon & Woo Ji-hoon
- Ending theme: Various themes (Note: The end themes used vary per episode but are all singles from Extraordinary You: Original Soundtrack. See the list of singles for details.)
- Composer: Park Se-joon et al.
- Country of origin: South Korea
- Original language: Korean
- No. of episodes: 32 (Note: In order to circumvent Korean laws that prevent commercial breaks in the middle of an episode, what would previously have been aired as single 70 minute episodes are now being repackaged as two 35 minute episodes, with two episodes being shown each night with a commercial break between the two.)

Production
- Executive producer: Kim Dong-rae
- Producers: Moon Joo-hee; Namkoong Sung-woo
- Camera setup: Single-camera
- Running time: 35 minutes
- Production companies: MBC Drama Production; RaemongRaein Co., Ltd.

Original release
- Network: MBC TV
- Release: October 2 – November 21, 2019

Extraordinary You (Korean: 어쩌다 발견한 하루) is a 2019 South Korean television series starring Kim Hye-yoon, Rowoon, Lee Jae-wook, Lee Na-eun, Jung Gun-joo, Kim Young-dae, and Lee Tae-ri. It is based on the webtoon July Found by Chance which was first published in January 2018 on Daum Webtoon. The series aired on MBC TV's Wednesdays and Thursdays 21:00 (KST) time slot from October 2 to November 21, 2019.

== Synopsis ==
The series follows high school girl Eun Dan-oh (Kim Hye-yoon) who is a student at a prestigious academy. One day, by chance, she discovers that the world she lives in is a fantasy world of comics. She and everyone else are merely characters in a comic book entitled Secret, (Note: Korean title: 비밀, RR: bimil) all under the authority of their omnipotent and omniscient Writer. Dan-oh is only an extra character and, worse, the Writer gave her a lame set-up: she is engaged to her long-time crush who despises her, and she has a heart disease and is expected to die soon.

Not satisfied with this fate, Dan-oh decides to forge her own destiny by changing the story's plot and finding her own true love. Her hopes of freeing herself from the Writer's control becomes stronger than before when she unexpectedly meets nameless Student Number 13 (Rowoon). But as the events around Dan-oh and Number 13, whom she named as Haru, gradually start to have parallels with the Writer's previous work Neungsohwa, (Note: Korean title: 능소화 (stylized as 능소花, replacing 화 with its Hanja equivalent). The title refers to the flowering vine trumpet creeper (Campsis grandiflora).) changing her destiny could have a price to pay.

== Cast ==
=== Main ===
- Kim Hye-yoon as Eun Dan-oh (Secret and Neungsohwa)

A student of Class 2-7 in Seuli High School; an extra character in Secret and the female main character of Neungsohwa. Dan-oh is the beautiful and only daughter of a wealthy family who still has a heart disease despite having been operated on multiple times. After sensing weird things happening to her, Dan-oh finds out that she and everyone else around her live in a fantasy world inside a teen fiction comic book entitled Secret, of which she is only an extra character. As a character in Secret, she is engaged to Kyung, her crush for almost a decade, and could possibly die soon due to her health condition.
Dan-oh was also a main character in one of the Writer's previous works, the period romance comic book Neungsohwa, which is set in the Goryeo era. In Neungsohwa, she is Lady Eun Dan-oh, a noble maiden betrothed to Prince Baek Kyung.

- Rowoon as Number 13 / Ha-ru (Secret and Neungsohwa)

A student of Class 2-7 in Seuli High School; an extra character in Secret and one of the male main characters of Neungsohwa. Ha-ru is a handsome student that Dan-oh starts noticing and liking after he saves her multiple times, helping Dan-oh in changing her fate. He is a nameless extra in Secret that even other characters are not aware of his existence. Being the 13th student in the class roster, Dan-oh calls him Number 13 (Note: 13번, RR: Sipsambeon) at first. Later on, Dan-oh names him Ha-ru (Note: 하루, RR: haru, "day") which, seemingly like a coincidence, was also his name in his former role in Neungsohwa. He has been aware that he is a character in a comic book.
Ha-ru was a main character in Neungsohwa as a warrior and Prince Baek Kyung's personal guard.

- Lee Jae-wook as Baek Kyung (Secret and Neungsohwa)

A student of Class 2-7 in Seuli High School; a supporting character in Secret and one of the male main characters of Neungsohwa. Kyung is a rude and arrogant student who has an abusive father and a greedy stepmother. He is a member of the A3, a trio of the most handsome and powerful boys in their school. He is engaged to Dan-oh, whom he dislikes due to circumstances around their arranged marriage. After observing Dan-oh, Ha-ru, and Do-hwa's strange behavior, he starts becoming aware that he is a character in a comic book, and slowly realises that he actually likes Dan-oh, as driven by his jealousy towards her close relationship with Ha-ru.
He was also a main character in Neungsohwa as Prince Baek Kyung, the brother of King Geum Jin-mi and Lady Eun's fiancé.

- Lee Na-eun as Yeo Joo-da (Secret)

A student of Class 2-7 in Seuli High School; the female main character (Note: The names of the characters Yeo Joo-da (여주다, yeojuda) and Oh Nam-joo (오남주, onamju) uses word play to imply their status in the comic book. "Yeo Joo-da" is based from yeo-ju (여주), the shortened form of yeoja ju-ingong (여자 주인공, "heroine" or "female main character"), while "Oh Nam-joo" is based from nam-ju, the shortened form of namja ju-ingong (남자 주인공, "hero" or "male main character").) of Secret. Joo-da is a beautiful student who comes from a poor family but is optimistic despite being bullied and has a kind heart. She senses strange things around her and eventually realizes that she is the protagonist in a comic book but keeps it a secret.

- Jung Gun-joo as Lee Do-hwa (Secret)

A student of Class 2-8 in Seuli High School and the second male main character of Secret. A member of the A3, Do-hwa is a friendly student, appeared to be cold and cool, who is skilled in music and hides his loneliness and sadness behind his bright smile. He secretly harbors feelings for Joo-da and is in a love triangle with A3 leader Nam-joo. Like Dan-oh, he senses strange things happening to him and later learns from Dan-oh about his existence as a character in a comic book.

- Kim Young-dae as Oh Nam-joo (Secret)

A student of Class 2-7 in Seuli High School and the male main character of Secret. Nam-joo is a second-generation chaebol, and the leader of A3. He also has feelings for Joo-da and is entangled in a love triangle with A3 member Do-hwa.

- Lee Tae-ri as Jinmichae (Secret) / Geum Jin-mi (Neungsohwa)

A cafeteria cook in Seuli High School; an extra character in Secret and supporting character in Neungsohwa. Handsome yet mysterious, Jinmichae is nicknamed Dried Squid Fairy (Note: 진미채 요정, RR: Jinmichae Yojeong) by adoring female students. He seems to know more about the world of comics than anyone else.
He was a supporting character in Neungsohwa where he started to become aware of his existence as a comic book character while playing the role of King Geum Jin-mi.

=== Supporting ===
==== Seuli High School ====
Note: The following characters are part of the world of the comic book Secret unless indicated otherwise.

- Kim Ji-in as Shin Sae-mi

A student of Class 2-7 in Seuli High School; Dan-oh and Soo-chul's close friend. She harbors a long-time crush for Nam-joo and bullies Joo-da for being Nam-joo's love interest despite her low status. She used to have a crush on Nam-joo but starts falling for her best friend Soo-chul.

- Kim Hyun-mok as Ahn Soo-chul

A student of Class 2-7 in Seuli High School; Dan-oh and Sae-mi's close friend. He is a web vlogger who wishes to have millions of subscribers.

- Jung Ye-nok as Kim Il-jin (Note: The given names of the three girl bullies Il-jin, Yi-jin and Sam-jin have jin (진) as the second syllable, preceded by the number 1, 2, or 3 in Sino-Korean (일 il, 이 i or yi, 삼 sam) as the first syllable.) (Note: Il-jin's name 일진 (iljin), in South Korean popular culture, refers to a notorious kind of bully in schools who is feared for his/her harsh and frequent harassment of fellow students. It could also refer to a group or gang of such bullies.)

A student of Class 2-7 in Seuli High School; one of the three girl bullies who harass Joo-da with Sae-mi. One of Nam-joo's admirers.

- Jung Mi-mi as Park Yi-jin

A student of Class 2-7 in Seuli High School; one of the three girl bullies who harass Joo-da with Sae-mi. One of Nam-joo's admirers.

- Jung Ye-jin as Lee Sam-jin

A student of Class 2-7 in Seuli High School; one of the three girl bullies who harass Joo-da with Sae-mi. One of Nam-joo's admirers.

- Han Chae-kyung as Kim Ae-il (Note: The given names of the three members of Kyung's fanclub Ae-il, Ae-ri and Ae-sam have ae (애) as the first syllable, followed by the number 1, 2, or 3 in Sino-Korean (일 il, 이 i or ri, 삼 sam) as the second syllable.)

A student of Class 2-7 in Seuli High School; one of Kyung's admirers

- Song Ji-woo as Park Ae-ri

A student of Class 2-7 in Seuli High School; one of Kyung's admirers

- Kang Min-ji as Lee Ae-sam

A student of Class 2-7 in Seuli High School; one of Kyung's admirers

- Jung Dae-ro as Kim Yang-il (Note: The given names of the three boy bullies Yang-il, Yang-yi and Yang-sam have yang (양) as the first syllable, followed by the number 1, 2, or 3 in Sino-Korean (일 il, 이 i or yi, 삼 sam) as the second syllable.)

A student of Class 2-7 in Seuli High School; one of the three boy bullies, who sometimes call themselves "Y3" when the A3 is not around.

- Lee Wo-je as Park Yang-yi

A student of Class 2-7 in Seuli High School; one of the three boy bullies

- Yoon Jong-bin as Lee Yang-sam

A student of Class 2-7 in Seuli High School; one of the three boy bullies

- Jo Deok-hee as Kim Ban-jang (Note: Ban-jang's name 반장 (banjang) literally means "class president.")

A student of Class 2-7 in Seuli High School; the class president.

- Oh Jong-min as Kim Bo-tong (Note: Bo-tong's name 보통 (botong) literally means "being ordinary or average.")

A student of Class 2-7 in Seuli High School; a guy with ordinary face and personality and average grades

- Kim Joon-sung as Park Mo-bum (Note: Mo-bum's name 모범 (mobeom) literally means "model" or "example.")

A student of Class 2-7 in Seuli High School; the class nerd and model student

- Shin Yong-ho as Shin Ba-ram

A student of Class 2-7 in Seuli High School.

- Han Myung-hwan as Kang Chul-nam

A student of Class 2-7 in Seuli High School.

- Jung Ji-hyun as Han Soo-da

A student of Class 2-7 in Seuli High School.

- Lee Eun-hye as Kong Joo-hae

A student of Class 2-7 in Seuli High School.

- Heo Soo-bin as Wang Bit-na

A student of Class 2-7 in Seuli High School.

- Pyo Hyun-jin as Namgoong Dan-bal

A student of Class 2-7 in Seuli High School.

- Kim Tae-jung as Chae Yook-in

A student of Class 2-7 in Seuli High School.

- Kim Jung-hak as homeroom teacher
- Kim Jae-hwa as art teacher
- Lee Ye-hyun as Kim Soo-hyang

A transfer student of Class 2-8 in Seuli High School (Secret); King Geum Jin-mi's love interest (Neungsohwa)

- Bae Hyun-sung as Baek Joon-hyun

A student in Seuli High School; Kyung's self-aware half-brother who remembers the past (Secret) / son of Lord Baek (Neungsohwa)

==== Others ====
- Um Hyo-sup as Eun Moo-young

Dan-oh's loving and caring father (Secret and Neungsohwa)

- Choi Jin-ho as Baek Dae-sung

Kyung's abusive and uncaring father (Secret) / a court official and Joon-hyun's father (Neungsohwa)

- Yoon Jong-hoon as Dr. Lee Jo-hwa

A cardiothoracic surgeon; Do-hwa's brother and Dan-oh's physician (Secret)

- Yu Ji-soo as Ra Hye-young

Kyung's stepmother (Secret)

- Yu Ha-bok as Oh Jae-beol (Note: Jae-beol's name 재벌 (jaebeol) is a reference to the "chaebol", South Korean industrial conglomerate families.)

Nam-joo's father (Secret)

- Ji Soo-won as Cha Ji-hyun

Nam-joo's mother (Secret) / Queen Dowager and mother of King Geum Jin-mi (Neungsohwa)

== Episodes ==
No.	Title	Directed by	Written by	Original release date
1	"Episode 1"	Kim Sang-hyeop	In Ji-hye & Song Ha-young	October 2, 2019
High school student Eun Dan-oh starts suffering from various symptoms including vision glitches, memory loss, "teleportation," sudden changes in personality and sporadically hearing a sound like that of flipping a page. While looking for answers, she discovers a strange book at the library entitled Secret and, upon flipping its pages, suddenly gains the ability to "see the future." Later, she witnesses what appears to be a magic portal materializing in midair.
2	"Episode 2"	Kim Sang-hyeop	In Ji-hye & Song Ha-young	October 2, 2019
Dan-oh becomes suspicious of the school cook Jinmichae after noticing that he can perceive the strange portal. Finding Secret in his possession, she sneaks in the cafeteria and discovers to her shock that Secret, a comic book, contains scenes that are exactly similar to what she had experienced previously. She comes into terms with the fact that the world she lives in is a fantasy world of comics and that she is one of the characters of Secret. Assuming she is the comic's protagonist, she later arrives at a shocking and embarrassing realization.
3	"Episode 3"	Kim Sang-hyeop	In Ji-hye & Song Ha-young	October 3, 2019
Dan-oh is very indignant with her being an extra character with a lame yet ominous set-up. Jinmichae explains to Dan-oh about their fantasy world and its two phases: the Stage and the Shadow. (Note: In Moo Ryuyee's July Found by Chance universe, the "Stage" and "Shadow" (originally "Heads" and "Tails") are the two alternating phases of the comic world. In the Stage, the Writer takes full control of the comic world as the scenes that are planned in the comic's "Storyboard" play out. Everything that happens and anything the characters say or do are all done as willed by the Writer, thus nothing happens in the Stage unless it is intended by the Writer. In the Shadow, the comic world is temporarily detached from the Writer's control. All characters can move or act freely while spaces or objects that exist in the comic world but are not yet drawn by the Writer act strangely (e.g. floating, moving in reverse). Those who have gained self-awareness (e.g. Dan-oh, Jinmichae) can remember events from the Shadow.) Unsatisfied with her fate, Dan-oh tries living life her way while in the Shadow but she loses to the Writer every time a Stage starts. A vision into the comic's Storyboard warns Dan-oh of an impending accident.
4	"Episode 4"	Kim Sang-hyeop	In Ji-hye & Song Ha-young	October 3, 2019
The accident foretold in Dan-oh's Storyboard vision happens exactly as it is except for one thing: a boy randomly arrives at the scene and saves her in the midst of the incident. Dan-oh searches the school for the mystery boy, thinking he could help her change her fate. Finding him at a garden filled with trumpet creepers, Dan-oh finally gets to meet her sole savior.
5	"Episode 5"	Kim Sang-hyeop	In Ji-hye & Song Ha-young	October 9, 2019
Dan-oh tries communicating with the mystery boy, only to learn that he is a mute, nameless extra character who is the 13th in the class roster. Lee Do-hwa starts gaining self-awareness and, unnerved, rushes to Dan-oh and Jinmichae for answers. Dan-oh overhears bad news about her failing health. As a new Storyboard vision warns Dan-oh of another accident involving her, she thinks Student Number 13 could turn the tide once again.
6	"Episode 6"	Kim Sang-hyeop	In Ji-hye & Song Ha-young	October 9, 2019
Dan-oh tries her best to make sure Student Number 13 remembers her. She hopes for another twist in her fate during the school field trip after another vision there reveals that Student Number 13 is among the attendees. Much to Dan-oh's distress, the Stage happened exactly as planned in the Storyboard. As Dan-oh starts to lose hope, a surprise from Student Number 13 awaits her.
7	"Episode 7"	Kim Sang-hyeop	In Ji-hye & Song Ha-young	October 9, 2019
A Storyboard vision tells Dan-oh of a nighttime couple trekking through the forest. Dan-oh gets lost in the forest despite her effort to memorize the route beforehand. She runs into Student Number 13 who surprises her with his recently acquired ability to speak. As the duo spend a moment in a riverside grove of trumpet creepers deep in the forest, Student Number 13 earns his new nickname: Ha-ru. To Dan-oh and Do-hwa's surprise, Baek Kyung starts acting outside his set-up.
8	"Episode 8"	Kim Sang-hyeop	In Ji-hye & Song Ha-young	October 9, 2019
After learning about Ha-ru, Jinmichae gives Dan-oh an ominous warning: everything will go wrong once extras get names and start acting of their own accord. He later discovers Ha-ru's personal space in the school library and his many pencil sketches, most of which portray Dan-oh. As Kyung takes his pent-up anger and frustration out on Dan-oh, Ha-ru comes to Dan-oh's rescue and inadvertently gives his secret away to her.
9	"Episode 9"	Kim Sang-hyeop	In Ji-hye & Song Ha-young	October 16, 2019
As Dan-oh realizes Ha-ru is self-aware and clearly remembers her, she introduces him to her peers and teaches him the ways of extra characters. Kyung gets more confused as Dan-oh, Ha-ru and Do-hwa speak of things he does not understand. Ha-ru receives a dire warning from Jinmichae: the scar on his left hand will become more painful if he continue seeking for answers and changing the Stage.
10	"Episode 10"	Kim Sang-hyeop	In Ji-hye & Song Ha-young	October 16, 2019
Do-hwa reflects on the stark similarity between his real self and the character the Writer assigned to him. A Storyboard vision informs Dan-oh of Oh Nam-joo's confession to Yeo Joo-da on the night of his upcoming birthday party. Jinmichae notices the panels in Secret glitching and Ha-ru's face becoming more definite. After Ha-ru sneaks his way into the birthday party to let Do-hwa confess to Joo-da first, the Stage changes in a way Ha-ru and Dan-oh did not expect.
11	"Episode 11"	Kim Sang-hyeop	In Ji-hye & Song Ha-young	October 17, 2019
Right after changing the birthday party Stage, the pain in Ha-ru's scar suddenly returns worse than before. Jinmichae warns that the Writer is willing to eliminate erring extras like Ha-ru. Unnerved at first, Ha-ru ultimately affirms to Jinmichae his decision to stay on Dan-oh's side and be the only person who can change her fate. Do-hwa is ousted from A3.
12	"Episode 12"	Kim Sang-hyeop	In Ji-hye & Song Ha-young	October 17, 2019
Dan-oh and Ha-ru notice that their classmates and teachers had started paying attention to Ha-ru and, later, addressing him by his name. They discover to their surprise that Ha-ru's previously blank nametag now bears his name. As the news worries Jinmichae, Dan-oh notices days later at a swimming class that Ha-ru's nametag is empty once again. Chaos suddenly breaks out among their classmates and Dan-oh is accidentally thrown into the pool. She wakes up in the hospital to a shocking news.
13	"Episode 13"	Kim Sang-hyeop	In Ji-hye & Song Ha-young	October 23, 2019
Much to Dan-oh's distress, Ha-ru has disappeared, Kyung reveals to her his self-awareness, and Jinmichae puts the blame on her for Ha-ru's untimely vanishing. Though she promises to Jinmichae not to rebel anymore, she is emotionally tormented by her loss. On the school sports day, Jinmichae and Do-hwa discover an astounding change in Secret.
14	"Episode 14"	Kim Sang-hyeop	In Ji-hye & Song Ha-young	October 23, 2019
Ha-ru has reappeared in the comic world, but he now has a set-up, is not self-aware, has lost his memories and has no scar in his left hand. Dan-oh admits to Jinmichae that, though she has no plans to help the new Ha-ru gain self-awareness, she has become afraid about her ultimate fate. Soon, Ha-ru starts hearing the page flipping noise; he is compelled to go to his old personal space in the library where a portal opens up, revealing a scene seemingly dating back in ancient times.
15	"Episode 15"	Kim Sang-hyeop	In Ji-hye & Song Ha-young	October 24, 2019
In old Ha-ru's personal space, the new Ha-ru witnesses a flower of the trumpet creeper falling from the portal and observes his past self's sketches of Dan-oh and the flower. Jinmichae stumbles into Ha-ru and accidentally reveals to him the second comic book he is reading: the period romance Neungsohwa. Ha-ru starts having dreams of himself and Dan-oh set during the Goryeo era.
16	"Episode 16"	Kim Sang-hyeop	In Ji-hye & Song Ha-young	October 24, 2019
Do-hwa is reinstated in the A3. At the library, Kyung discovers Neungsohwa in the spot where Secret should be, and notices a Goryeo girl character similar to Dan-oh, just before Jinmichae arrives to steal the book. Ha-ru gets agitated as Dan-oh, who soon realizes he has become self-aware though without memories of her, keeps on reminding him he is not himself anymore. As Jinmichae burns Neungsohwa to prevent anyone from reading it, Ha-ru gets strangely attracted to the trumpet creepers in the school garden and hears the sound of flipping pages.
17	"Episode 17"	Kim Sang-hyeop	In Ji-hye & Song Ha-young	October 30, 2019
Ha-ru is compelled towards his old personal space where the portal, which has opened once again, finally restores his scar and his memories. He reunites with Dan-oh and promises to never let her go. In the library, Kyung notices that Neungsohwa is missing and searches for information about the trumpet creeper which the book's title represents.
18	"Episode 18"	Kim Sang-hyeop	In Ji-hye & Song Ha-young	October 30, 2019
Ha-ru once again sees visions of himself and Dan-oh in the Goryeo era; Dan-oh starts feelings chest pains. As Kyung learns of Ha-ru's return to his old self, Jinmichae tries to analyze Ha-ru's restoration and fears the prospect of the "tragedy" in Neungsohwa happening again in Secret. Ha-ru admits to Kyung that he has feelings for Dan-oh.
19	"Episode 19"	Kim Sang-hyeop	In Ji-hye & Song Ha-young	October 31, 2019
To Jinmichae's shock, Kyung discovers the remains of Neungsohwa which still has a few unburned pages he can salvage. Dan-oh keeps having butterflies because of Ha-ru and realizes she likes him very much. Jinmichae reminds the intrigued Kyung that not everyone has the power to change Stages: Ha-ru can, but all other characters cannot.
20	"Episode 20"	Kim Sang-hyeop	In Ji-hye & Song Ha-young	October 31, 2019
For the first time, Ha-ru ranks first in the class, overtaking Kyung. To prove Kyung wrong, Ha-ru successfully modifies a Stage where Dan-oh is supposed to be rescued by Kyung after collapsing due to her failing heart. Dan-oh becomes more worried as her chest pains recur despite the change of Stages. Dan-oh and Ha-ru's budding romance is put to the test as a lengthy Stage separates the couple.
21	"Episode 21"	Kim Sang-hyeop	In Ji-hye & Song Ha-young	November 6, 2019
Dan-oh and Ha-ru reunites after their month-long separation due to the Stage. The traumatic memories from Neungsohwa torment Jinmichae as Kyung vows to find out the secrets he has been hiding. A vision into their Goryeo past reminds Ha-ru of how the old Dan-oh loved to see the stars at night.
22	"Episode 22"	Kim Sang-hyeop	In Ji-hye & Song Ha-young	November 6, 2019
Ha-ru encounters a girl transferee Kim Soo-hyang and feels something is off about her. Later, a vision into their Goryeo past reveals to Ha-ru the relationship he had with the old Kyung, his first encounter with the old Dan-oh and the first moments of his self-awareness. As Jinmichae warns him not to do "the same mistake" again, Ha-ru prepares a surprise for Dan-oh at the school's arts room.
23	"Episode 23"	Kim Sang-hyeop	In Ji-hye & Song Ha-young	November 7, 2019
As Kyung gets more riveted to know the past, Jinmichae turns emotional and reveals about how he lost everything in Neungsohwa, putting the blame on Kyung. Ha-ru tells Dan-oh about the visions he had of their past. Do-hwa notices something is not quite right about Joo-da. Keeping Neungsohwa a secret to Dan-oh, Kyung correctly guesses an action she is set to do in an upcoming Stage.
24	"Episode 24"	Kim Sang-hyeop	In Ji-hye & Song Ha-young	November 7, 2019
More visions from Neungsohwa reveal to Ha-ru the relationship his old self had with the old Dan-oh. After touching the unburnt pages of Neungsohwa that Kyung salvaged, Dan-oh experiences a new Storyboard vision which warns her of Kyung's upcoming public proposal to her at a video fair. To stop the proposal, Ha-ru vehemently fights against the Writer's will as his scar starts to bleed and he sees a fleeting vision of Neungsohwa's tragic ending. Jinmichae is floored upon first seeing Soo-hyang at the video fair.
25	"Episode 25"	Kim Sang-hyeop	In Ji-hye & Song Ha-young	November 13, 2019
A Storyboard vision warns Dan-oh that her ultimate fate—her death due to her failing heart in the midst of a surgery—would be the next to play out in the Stage. After seeing more details into Neungsohwa's tragic ending in another vision, Ha-ru realizes that the story is happening again in Secret. Dan-oh asks a favor from Jinmichae, Kyung and Do-hwa.
26	"Episode 26"	Kim Sang-hyeop	In Ji-hye & Song Ha-young	November 13, 2019
Acting outside her role, Joo-da takes revenge against her bullies. Ha-ru learns of Dan-oh's upcoming surgery and becomes a bit overprotective for her. Do-hwa realizes that Joo-da has long been self-aware. As Ha-ru and Dan-oh learns that the schedule for the surgery has been set, Kyung finds himself in Ha-ru's personal space at the library where the portal reveals to him a shocking scene from Neungsohwa.
27	"Episode 27"	Kim Sang-hyeop	In Ji-hye & Song Ha-young	November 14, 2019
Ha-ru disguises, with Do-hwa's help, as a doctor and tries hard to change the Stage, preventing Dan-oh's surgery from happening. After the portal's revelation, Kyung rushes to the hospital, thinking Ha-ru murdered Dan-oh back in Neungsohwa. Kyung separately tells Dan-oh and Ha-ru about the revelation. As Ha-ru feels apprehensive, he invites Dan-oh to camping with her friends but their fun is cut short as Dan-oh feels chest pains once again.
28	"Episode 28"	Kim Sang-hyeop	In Ji-hye & Song Ha-young	November 14, 2019
Ha-ru realizes a flaw in the way he had changed Dan-oh's heart surgery Stage. Jinmichae reminds Kyung of the atrocity he had done to Soo-hyang back in Neungsohwa, telling him the difference between dying in the Stage and in the Shadow. Through another vision, Ha-ru witnesses more details about Neungsohwa's tragic ending and fears Kyung's accusation might be true. As Dan-oh falls severely ill in the Shadow, Kyung sees a vision of the ending and realizes in shock who really murdered the old Dan-oh.
29	"Episode 29"	Kim Sang-hyeop	In Ji-hye & Song Ha-young	November 20, 2019
After dying in the Shadow, Dan-oh reappears in the comic world but she has lost her self-awareness and memories. As Secret's ending looms, Jinmichae tells Ha-ru about the fate all characters suffer after a story ends. Ha-ru vows to help Dan-oh regain her self-awareness. Kyung goes out on a date with Dan-oh.
30	"Episode 30"	Kim Sang-hyeop	In Ji-hye & Song Ha-young	November 20, 2019
As an extra character disappears from the comic world, Dan-oh's memories come to her in bits and she start to feel the symptoms of self-awareness. Ha-ru completes Dan-oh's restoration with help from the conceding Kyung and the couple reunites. Dan-oh ensures a closure with Kyung and forgives him for what he had done back in Neungsohwa. Ha-ru notices something strange with his nametag and the arts room.
31	"Episode 31"	Kim Sang-hyeop	In Ji-hye & Song Ha-young	November 21, 2019
Ha-ru keeps secret from Dan-oh that he had seen the arts room disintegrating and his nametag becoming blank. As more extras disappear from the comic world and more spaces disintegrate, Ha-ru tries to make Dan-oh's bucket list come true while Jinmichae arranges a reconciliation-farewell date with Ha-ru and Kyung.
32	"Episode 32"	Kim Sang-hyeop	In Ji-hye & Song Ha-young	November 21, 2019
As his scar fades away and darkness starts to swallow him up, Ha-ru spends his last seconds with Dan-oh and bids her a painful farewell. Skipping to a year later to their graduation, Dan-oh and her fellow characters make their last moments and say their last lines as Secret comes to its inevitable end.

== Production ==
=== Development ===
The series is based on the webtoon July Found by Chance, written by MooRyuyee. It was serialized on the portal site of Daum webtoon from January 18, 2018, to September 19, 2019.

It is directed by Kim Sang-hyeop who directed previous hit television series such as Dong Yi (2010), Mama (2014), Glamorous Temptation (2015), and The King in Love (2017).

It was tentatively titled as July Found by Chance (어쩌다 발견한 7월; Eojjeoda balgyeonhan 7wol), the same title as the webtoon which it was based on.

=== Casting ===
On March 27, 2019, it was reported that Kim Hye-yoon was in talks to star in the series. On May 9, it was announced that Rowoon had been cast for the male lead role. On June 10, Kim and Rowoon confirmed their roles, alongside Lee Jae-wook. In the following days, additional cast members including, Lee Na-eun, Jung Gun-joo, Kim Young-dae, Lee Tae-ri, and Kim Ji-in also confirmed their participation.

It was later revealed that the casting process alone spanned three months. Initially, Kim Hye-yoon was cast as a candidate for the role of Yeo Joo-da. However, after a meeting with the director, he increasingly saw her as a perfect fit for Eun Dan-oh. Rowoon had originally planned to audition for the role of Baek Kyung. Yet, after in-depth discussions with the director, he was ultimately chosen for the role of Haru instead. Similarly, Lee Jae-wook, who had initially auditioned for the role of Haru, ultimately took on the role of Baek Kyung after the director felt he would better synchronize with that character.

== Release ==
The series was initially set for first broadcast in September 25, 2019, but it was postponed to October 2, 2019 to the preemption of the previous show during the Chuseok holiday.

From March 16, 2022, MBC TV arranged a rerun of Extraordinary You in anticipation of the premiere of Rowoon's new drama Tomorrow. This rerun spanned for four weeks. Additionally, on June 6, 2024, MBC also scheduled a two-day rerun on the MBC On channel, specifically on the 8th and 9th, in response to Kim Hye-yoon's sudden surge in popularity due to her role in Lovely Runner.

== Original soundtrack ==
Extraordinary You: Original Soundtrack

Soundtrack album by Various artists
- Released: November 20, 2019
- Genre: Soundtrack
- Length: 204:41
- Languages: Korean; English
- Labels: VLENDING; MusicBuddy

=== Extraordinary You: Original Soundtrack ===
The drama's soundtrack is compiled in a three-part album released by labels VLENDING and MusicBuddy on 20 November 2019. CD 1 contains the drama's theme songs and their instrumental versions, CDs 2 and 3 contain the drama's musical score.

Extraordinary You: Original Soundtrack

CD 1
No.	Title	Lyrics	Music	Artist	Length
1.	"Feeling"	Taibian; JeA; Siha	Taibian; JeA; Siha	April	3:08
2.	"My Beauty"	Kim Bum-ju; Kim Si-hyuk	Kim Bum-ju; Kim Si-hyuk	Verivery (Note: Performed by Verivery members Minchan, Gyehyeon and Yeonho)	3:51
3.	"First Love" (첫사랑)	Epitone Project	Epitone Project	Sondia	3:45
4.	"First Love (Drama Version)" (첫사랑 Drama Version)	Epitone Project	Epitone Project	Epitone Project	4:00
5.	"Today I Wanna Say That I Love You" (오늘은 꼭)	Han-joon; Park Se-joon	GOTCHA!	GOTCHA!	2:37
6.	"The Story That Has Never Been Told" (한 번도 하지 못한 이야기)	Han Kyung-soo; Choi Han-sol	Han Kyung-soo; Choi Han-sol	Sondia	4:04
7.	"Neverending Story" (끝나지 않을 이야기)	Park Se-joon; Taibian; Changbin (Stray Kids)	Taibian; Baaq; CHKmate	Stray Kids	4:05
8.	"Draw You" (너를 그린다)	Park Se-joon; Han Joon	Kim Chang-rak; Kim Soo-bin	Jeong Se-woon	4:43
9.	"Feeling" (instrumental)		Taibian; JeA; Siha	April	3:08
10.	"My Beauty" (instrumental)		Kim Bum-ju; Kim Si-hyuk	Verivery	3:52
11.	"First Love" (첫사랑) (instrumental)		Epitone Project	Sondia	3:45
12.	"First Love (Drama Version)" (첫사랑 Drama Version) (instrumental)		Epitone Project	Epitone Project	4:00
13.	"Today I Wanna Say That I Love You" (오늘은 꼭) (instrumental)		GOTCHA!	GOTCHA!	2:37
14.	"The Story That Has Never Been Told" (한 번도 하지 못한 이야기) (instrumental)		Han Kyung-soo; Choi Han-sol	Sondia	4:04
15.	"Neverending Story" (끝나지 않을 이야기) (instrumental)		Taibian; Baaq; CHKmate	Stray Kids	4:05
16.	"Draw You" (너를 그린다) (instrumental)		Kim Chang-rak; Kim Soo-bin	Jeong Se-woon	4:43
Total length:					60:27

CD 2
No.	Title	Artist	Length
1.	"Walk This Sky"	Park Se-joon; Woo Ji-hoon	1:25
2.	"See the Fantasy"	Lee Nyum	2:27
3.	"A Door to Time"	Lee Nyum	3:01
4.	"Through Time"	Kim Dong-hyuk; Lee Han-bum	3:32
5.	"Touch by Touch"	Park Se-joon; Na Yoon-shik	2:36
6.	"Center Girl"	Park Se-joon; Woo Ji-hoon	1:36
7.	"Solitude"	Song Jae-kyung	1:40
8.	"Yellow Sky"	Song Jin-suk; Hwang Seung-pil	2:26
9.	"Conti"	Park Se-joon; Kim Min-ji	3:40
10.	"By Chance"	Lee Nyum	2:26
11.	"Burning Light"	Park Se-joon; Na Sang-jin	2:05
12.	"Pearly Rain"	Park Se-joon; Na Yoon-shik	2:44
13.	"Tricky"	Kim Dong-hyuk; Lee Han-bum	1:59
14.	"Shiny Morning"	Song Jae-kyung	3:04
15.	"Poop"	Park Se-joon; Woo Ji-hoon	3:28
16.	"There's a Problem"	Lee Nyum	1:52
17.	"A Blank of Memory"	Park Se-joon	2:39
18.	"Hype"	Kim Dong-hyuk; Lee Han-bum	1:51
19.	"Dazzlingly Love"	Park Se-joon; Kim Min-ji	2:10
20.	"Ocean Dreams"	Park Se-joon; Na Yoon-shik	2:42
21.	"Heart Memory"	Lee Nyum	2:41
22.	"Ego"	Park Se-joon; Kim Min-ji	1:55
23.	"High School Runway"	Park Se-joon; Woo Ji-hoon	1:33
24.	"House of Glass"	Song Jin-suk; Hwang Seung-pil	1:52
25.	"By Accident"	Park Se-joon; Kim Min-ji	2:24
26.	"Where Are We"	Park Se-joon; Na Sang-jin	1:55
27.	"Glow"	Park Se-joon; Kim Min-ji	2:42
28.	"A Turbulent Period"	Park Se-joon; Woo Ji-hoon	1:42
29.	"Strange Feeling"	Park Se-joon; Woo Ji-hoon	1:58
Total length:			68:05

CD 3
No.	Title	Artist	Length
1.	"Honey Butter"	Park Se-joon; Woo Ji-hoon	1:45
2.	"What Little Girl Want"	Park Se-joon; Woo Ji-hoon	1:32
3.	"Connecting Room"	Park Se-joon	1:56
4.	"Cloud Cotton"	Park Se-joon; Kim Min-ji	2:51
5.	"Summer Star"	Park Se-joon; Na Sang-jin	3:15
6.	"A Cat on the Marimba"	Park Se-joon; Na Yoon-shik	1:18
7.	"A Girl on the Moon"	Park Se-joon; Na Yoon-shik	2:20
8.	"Rainbow Stairs"	Song Jin-suk; Hwang Seung-pil	1:20
9.	"Cloudy Sky"	Park Se-joon; Kim Min-ji	2:45
10.	"Get In"	Park Se-joon; Woo Ji-hoon	1:07
11.	"Exam Time" (시험시간)	Lee Nyum	1:43
12.	"Zap Zap"	Park Se-joon; Woo Ji-hoon	1:27
13.	"Light House"	Park Se-joon; Na Yoon-shik	2:13
14.	"Lovely Girl"	Park Se-joon; Kim Min-ji	1:55
15.	"King's First Love"	Lee Nyum	2:52
16.	"Requiem for Schizophrenia"	Song Jin-suk; Hwang Seung-pil	2:12
17.	"Perfume"	Park Se-joon; Kim Min-ji	2:20
18.	"Secret"	Park Se-joon; Kim Min-ji	1:52
19.	"Your Vacant Seat" (너의 빈자리)	Lee Nyum	2:25
20.	"Wing"	Park Se-joon; Kim Min-ji	1:43
21.	"Extra"	Park Se-joon; Kim Min-ji	1:47
22.	"Dark Side"	Park Se-joon; Kim Min-ji	2:05
23.	"Butterfly Effect" (나비효과)	Park Se-joon	2:22
24.	"System of Love"	Park Se-joon; Woo Ji-hoon	2:11
25.	"A Comic Found by Chance" (어쩌다 발견한 코믹)	Lee Nyum	1:43
26.	"Take"	Park Se-joon; Kim Min-ji	1:43
27.	"Head Ring"	Park Se-joon; Woo Ji-hoon	2:35
28.	"Suspicious Friend" (수상한 친구)	Lee Nyum	1:55
29.	"Blue King"	Park Se-joon; Kim Min-ji	1:58
30.	"A Shocking Comic" (어쩌다 심쿵 코믹)	Lee Nyum	2:01
31.	"Removing Nuclear"	Park Se-joon; Song Jin-suk	2:15
32.	"Jeremy"	Park Se-joon; Na Yoon-shik	1:47
33.	"Drone Tension II"	Park Se-joon; Song Jin-suk	2:05
34.	"End of Dawn"	Park Se-joon; Na Yoon-shik	3:25
35.	"Fallen Ring" (떨어진 반지)	Lee Nyum	2:01
36.	"A Time for You and Me" (너와 나의 시간)	Park Se-joon; Na Yoon-shik	3:25
Total length:			76:09

=== Singles ===
The following is the track list of singles from Extraordinary You: Original Soundtrack.

Singles from Extraordinary You (Parts 1–8)

Part 1

Released on October 2, 2019
No.	Title	Lyrics	Music	Artist	Length
1.	"Feeling"	Taibian; JeA; Siha	Taibian; JeA; Siha	April	3:08
2.	"Feeling" (Inst.)		TAIBIAN; JeA; Siha		3:08
Total length:					6:16

Part 2

Released on October 9, 2019
No.	Title	Lyrics	Music	Artist	Length
1.	"My Beauty"	Kim Bum-ju; Kim Si-hyuk	Kim Bum-ju; Kim Si-hyuk	Verivery	3:51
2.	"My Beauty" (Inst.)		Kim Bum-ju; Kim Si-hyuk		3:51
Total length:					7:42

Part 3

Released on October 16, 2019
No.	Title	Lyrics	Music	Artist	Length
1.	"First Love" (첫사랑)	Epitone Project	Epitone Project	Sondia	3:45
2.	"First Love" (Inst.)		Epitone Project		3:45
Total length:					7:30

Part 4

Released on October 23, 2019
No.	Title	Lyrics	Music	Artist	Length
1.	"First Love (Drama Ver.)" (첫사랑)	Epitone Project	Epitone Project	Epitone Project	4:00
2.	"First Love (Drama Ver.)" (Inst.)		Epitone Project		4:00
Total length:					8:00

Part 5

Released on October 30, 2019
No.	Title	Lyrics	Music	Artist	Length
1.	"Today I Wanna Say That I Love You" (오늘은 꼭)	Han-joon; Park Se-joon	GOTCHA!	GOTCHA!	2:36
2.	"Today I Wanna Say That I Love You" (Inst.)		GOTCHA!		2:36
Total length:					5:12

Part 6

Released on November 6, 2019
No.	Title	Lyrics	Music	Artist	Length
1.	"The Story That Has Never Been Told" (한 번도 하지 못한 이야기)	Han Kyung-soo; Choi Han-sol	Han Kyung-soo; Choi Han-sol	Sondia	4:04
2.	"The Story That Has Never Been Told" (Inst.)		Han Kyung-soo; Choi Han-sol		4:04
Total length:					8:08

Part 7

Released on November 7, 2019
No.	Title	Lyrics	Music	Artist	Length
1.	"Neverending Story" (끝나지 않을 이야기)	Park Se-joon; Taibian; Changbin (Stray Kids)	Taibian; Baaq; CHKmate	Stray Kids	4:05
2.	"Neverending Story" (Inst.)		Taibian; Baaq; CHKmate		4:05
Total length:					8:10

Part 8

Released on November 13, 2019
No.	Title	Lyrics	Music	Artist	Length
1.	"Draw You" (너를 그린다)	Park Se-joon; Han Joon	Kim Chang-rak; Kim Soo-bin	Jeong Se-woon	4:43
2.	"Draw You" (Inst.)		Kim Chang-rak; Kim Soo-bin		4:43
Total length:					9:26

== Reception ==
Despite the considerably modest viewership ratings, Extraordinary You received positive reviews among younger Korean audiences. The television series also won the 'Drama of the Year' award at MBC Drama Awards through viewers' voting.

Regarding this, Ha Jae-geun, a popular culture critic, said, "The younger generation has recently been flocking to online platforms such as YouTube instead of TV, and the main TV consumers have shifted to the middle-aged and older generations." He continued, "I think that as a broadcasting company, we have achieved meaningful results in successfully forming a consensus by communicating with the younger generation."

Average TV viewership ratings (nationwide)
Ep.	Broadcast date	Nielsen Korea
1	October 2, 2019	3.1% (40th)
2	October 2, 2019	3.5% (36th)
3	October 3, 2019	2.2% (49th)
4	October 3, 2019	3.3% (32nd)
5	October 9, 2019 (Note: Due to the broadcast of a football game for the 2022 FIFA World Cup qualification during Extraordinary You's time slot on October 10, four episodes aired on October 9.)	2.9% (37th)
6	October 9, 2019	3.9% (28th)
7	October 9, 2019	2.7% (41st)
8	October 9, 2019	3.1% (35th)
9	October 16, 2019	3.1% (36th)
10	October 16, 2019	4.1% (36th)
11	October 17, 2019	3.0% (24th)
12	October 17, 2019	3.8% (32nd)
13	October 23, 2019	3.1% (24th)
14	October 23, 2019	4.1% (32nd)
15	October 24, 2019	3.2% (24th)
16	October 24, 2019	3.5% (32nd)
17	October 30, 2019	3.0% (27th)
18	October 30, 2019	3.7% (36th)
19	October 31, 2019	2.9% (26th)
20	October 31, 2019	3.3% (36th)
21	November 6, 2019	3.1% (32nd)
22	November 6, 2019	3.6% (33rd)
23	November 7, 2019	3.1% (28th)
24	November 7, 2019	3.6% (29th)
25	November 13, 2019	2.9% (24th)
26	November 13, 2019	3.1% (37th)
27	November 14, 2019	2.7% (35th)
28	November 14, 2019	3.0% (36th)
29	November 20, 2019	3.0% (37th)
30	November 20, 2019	3.3% (33rd)
31	November 21, 2019	2.6% (39th)
32	November 21, 2019	3.6% (29th)
Average		3.2%
In the table above, the blue numbers represent the lowest ratings and the red numbers represent the highest ratings.

== Awards and nominations ==
Name of the award ceremony, year presented, category, nominee of the award, and the result of the nomination
Award ceremony	Year	Category	Nominee	Result	Ref.
APAN Star Awards	2021	Best New Actor	Lee Jae-wook	Nominated	
APAN Star Awards	2021	Popular Star Award, Actor	Lee Jae-wook	Nominated	
Baeksang Arts Awards	2020	Best New Actor – Television	Lee Jae-wook	Nominated	
Grimae Awards	2019	Best New Actor	Rowoon	Won	
MBC Drama Awards	2019	Drama of the Year	Extraordinary You	Won	
MBC Drama Awards	2019	Excellence Award, Actress in a Wednesday-Thursday Drama	Kim Hye-yoon	Won	
MBC Drama Awards	2019	Best Supporting Cast in a Wednesday-Thursday Drama	Lee Tae-ri	Nominated	
MBC Drama Awards	2019	Best New Actor	Rowoon	Won	
MBC Drama Awards	2019	Best New Actor	Lee Jae-wook	Won	
MBC Drama Awards	2019	Best New Actor	Jung Gun-joo	Nominated	
MBC Drama Awards	2019	Best New Actor	Kim Young-dae	Nominated	
MBC Drama Awards	2019	Best New Actress	Kim Hye-yoon	Won	
MBC Drama Awards	2019	Best New Actress	Lee Na-eun	Nominated	
MBC Drama Awards	2019	Best Couple Award	Kim Hye-yoon, Rowoon and Lee Jae-wook	Nominated	
Seoul International Drama Awards	2020	Outstanding Korean Drama	Extraordinary You	Won	
