= Lee Tae-ri =

South Korean actor

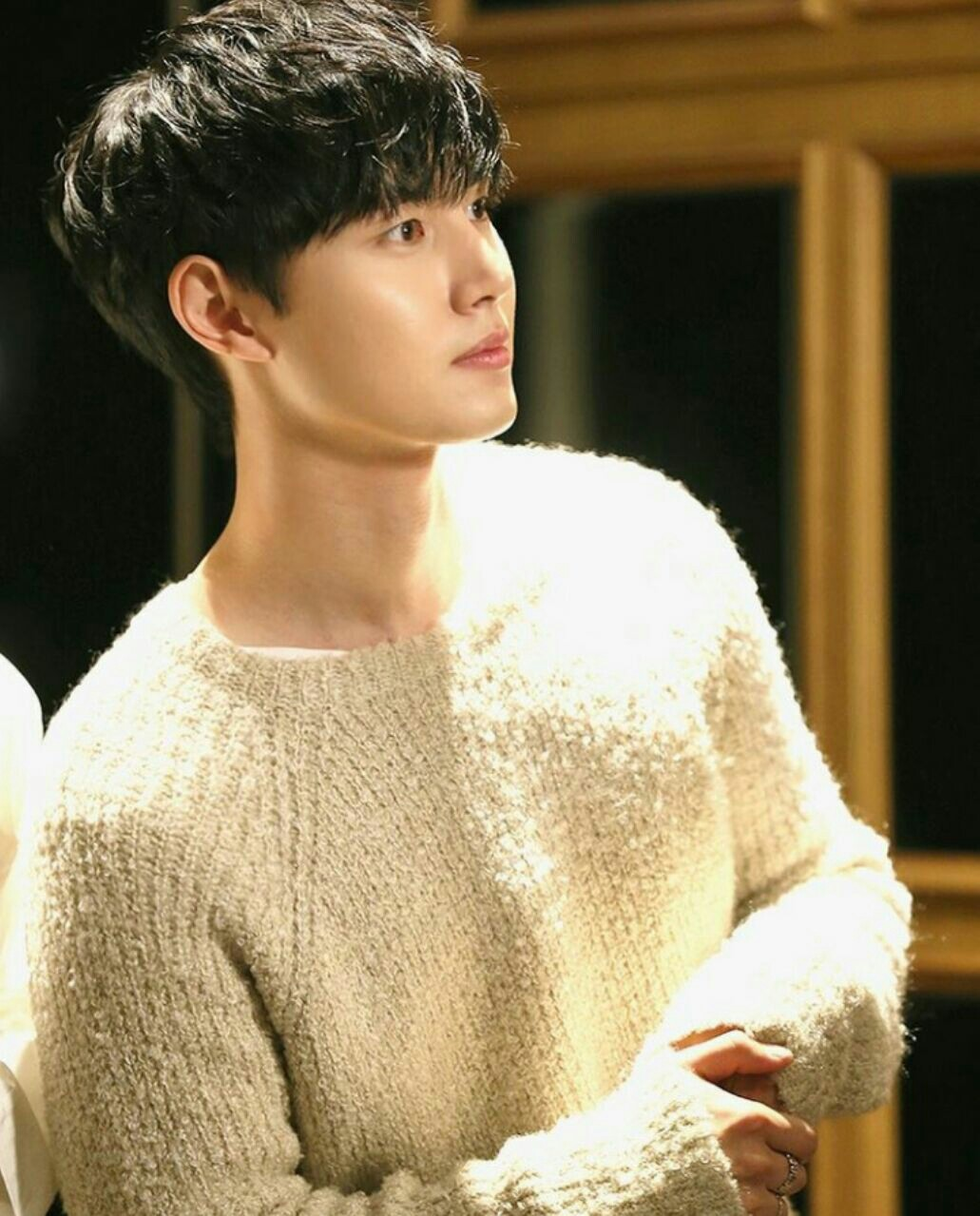
- Lee in 2021
- Born: Lee Min-ho; June 28, 1993 (age 33); Namyangju, Gyeonggi-do, South Korea
- Education: Chung-Ang University (Theater and Film)
- Occupation: Actor
- Years active: 1998–present
- Agent: Starhaus Entertainment
- Height: 181 cm (5 ft 11 1/2 in)
- Spouse: Unknown (m. 2026)

Korean name
- Hangul: 이태리
- Hanja: 李泰利
- RR: I Taeri
- MR: I T'aeri

Lee Tae-ri (Korean: 이태리; Hanja: 李泰利; born June 28, 1993), birth name Lee Min-ho, is a South Korean actor. He is well known for his role as young Yang Myung in Moon Embracing the Sun (2012), Song Man-bo in Rooftop Prince (2012), Jung Joo-hwan in The Beauty Inside (2018), Jinmichae/Geum Jin-mi in Extraordinary You (2019), and Imugi in Tale of the Nine Tailed (2020).

== Biography ==
=== Early life ===
Lee was born in Seoul, South Korea on June 28, 1993. His family consists of his father, mother and one older sister. He finished his high school at Paikyang High School and majored in theater in Chung-Ang University's Institute of the Arts.

Lee became an actor because it was his father's dream before but couldn't pursue it. He started playing soccer as a rebellion against his parents wish for him to pursue acting. He became the captain of his middle school's soccer team, and was awarded top score in 2008 Seoul FC Junior Championship Cup scoring 10 goals in a game. He wanted to become a professional soccer player, but eventually upon entering high school, he came to realize what acting was like and fully embraced it.

Lee Tae-ri considered using a stage name because many confused him with the City Hunter's Lee Min-ho but his parents disapproved of the idea and said that instead of changing his name, he should work harder to be recognized.

=== Career ===
Lee started his career as a child actor. He debuted at the age of five playing the role in the 1998 sitcom Soonpoong Clinic, followed by historical dramas Empress Myeongseong and Jang Gil San. In 2005, he starred with Yoo Seung-ho in KBS' children program Magic Warriors. He is also known for his roles in Gangnam Mom, Grudge: The Revolt of Gumiho and The Thorn Birds.

In 2012, Lee rose to fame after starring in the hit historical drama Moon Embracing the Sun. He was then cast as Song Kang-ho's rebellious son in the movie Howling. He appeared in the music video for 2BiC′s debut song "I Made Another Girl Cry".

Lee followed with a supporting role in the hit romantic comedy Rooftop Prince, where he played one of the 3 member of Yoochun's character entourage. He was then cast as the son of Shin Ha-kyun's character in the action film Running Man.

In 2013, Lee played supporting roles in the historical drama The Blade and Petal, and political romantic comedy Prime Minister & I.

In 2014, he had his first lead role in the youth film, School of Youths with Bae Seul-ki. He also co-starred with Bae Noo-ri in a 4 episode web drama Teleport Lovers, produced by Korean organization K-Move! to promote overseas employment among Korean youth.

In 2015, he was cast as a high school student who gets involved in a case with his music teacher in Kwak Jae-yong's Time Renegades. The same year, he played a supporting role as Grand Prince Bongnim in Splendid Politics.

In 2017, Lee was cast in the medical drama Hospital Ship, playing Ha Ji-won's brother. He is set to star next in the horror film, Woman's Wail.

In 2018, he started using Lee Tae-ri as his stage name and also signed up with Starhaus Entertainment. Lee was cast in the romantic comedy drama Coffee, Do Me a Favor as a musical actor; as well as the drama remake of the film The Beauty Inside.

In 2019, he was cast in Search: WWW as Godori and in another drama named Extraordinary You which was a remake of the webtoon July Found by Chance, Lee played the supporting role of Jinmichae, a worker in a high school who guides the self aware students from the comical life. Lee was also cast as a cameo in Voice.

In 2020, he was cast in Tale of the Nine Tailed as an Imoogi who is in constant conflict with a Gumiho (nine tail fox). Lee was later cast in a high school drama True Beauty (South Korean TV series) as a cameo.

In 2021, Lee was cast as Ma Hyun-bin in Young Lady and Gentleman.

In 2022, he was cast in The King of Tears, Lee Bang-won and Bloody Heart.

== Personal life ==
On May 24, 2026, Lee married his non-celebrity girlfriend.

== Filmography ==
=== Film ===
Year	Title	Role	Notes
2001	Waikiki Brothers	young In-ki	
2002	Show Show Show	Eun-ryong	
2007	Le Grand Chef	young Sung-chan	
2009	Actually, I am a Superman	boy	Independent short film
2010	Be With Me/Ghost	Park Chul-min	
2012	Howling	Sang-gil's son	
2013	Running Man	Cha Gi-hyuk	
2014	A Case of Bachelor Abduction	Mok-won	
2016	Time Renegades	Kang Seung-beom	
2018	Mysterious Fighter Project A	Leon	
2018	The Bittersweet	Xiaoma	Netflix
2018	The Wrath		
2018	Anastasia	Prince Lee	

=== Television series ===
Year	Title	Role	Notes	Ref.
1998	Soonpoong Clinic	Jung-bae		
1998	Legend of Ambition	Ha Seung-jun		
1998	The Great King's Road	Eun Jeon-goon		
1998	Sunflower	Park Sun-deok's son		
1999	Woman on Top			
2001	Empress Myeongseong	young Sunjong		
2002	Royal Story: Jang Hui-bin	Prince Yeoning		
2002	People in the Zoo	Jung Min-ho		
2004	Jang Gil San	Jung Do-ryeong		
2005	Magic Warriors Mir & Gaon	Gaon		
2006	Love and Ambition	Sang-woo		
2006	Fireworks	Bong-chang		
2006	High Kick!	young Soon-jae		
2007	Southern Mom Catch Up	Do Joon-yong		
2008	The Deacon and Deaconess	Ye-jun		
2009	My Dad Loves Trouble	Jin-soo	4-ep. drama special	
2010	Grudge: The Revolt of Gumiho	Jo Jung-kyu		
2010	Sungkyunkwan Scandal	Bok-soo	Ep. 10–11	
2010	Stormy Lovers	Lee Hyung-woo		
2011	The Thorn Birds	young Lee Young-jo		
2011	Gyebaek	teen Moon-geun		
2011	A Thousand Kisses	Moon Gi-joon	Ep. 22	
2011	TV Cultural Center - Eom Ji's	Suk-ho		
2012	Moon Embracing the Sun	young Prince Yang-myung		
2012	Rooftop Prince	Song Man-bo		
2012	The Great Seer	King Woo		
2013	The Blade and Petal	Crown Prince Hwangwon		
2013	Prime Minister & I	Park Hee-chul		
2015	Splendid Politics	Grand Prince Bongrim, later King Hyojong		
2017	Hospital Ship	Song Woo-jae		
2018	Coffee, Do Me a Favor	Moon Jung-won		
2018	The Curling Team	Min-woo		
2018	The Beauty Inside	Jung Joo-hwan		
2019	Voice	Tomoyuki	Cameo (s. 3, ep. 2)	
2019	Search: WWW	Godori	Cameo (ep. 7)	
2019	Extraordinary You	Jinmichae		
2020	Tale of the Nine Tailed	Imoogi		
2020	True Beauty	Wang Hyun-bin	Cameo (ep 1)	
2021	Young Lady and Gentleman	Ma Hyun-bin		
2022	The King of Tears, Lee Bang-won	Yi Je, Prince Yangnyeong		
2022	Bloody Heart	Park Nam-sang		
2023	Destined With You	Kim Wook		

=== Web series ===
Year	Title	Role	Notes
2014	Teleport Lover	Han Dong-hyeok	4-episode web series

=== Music video appearances ===
Year	Title	Singer
2012	"Made Yet Another Woman Cry"	2BiC

== Musical theatre ==
Year	Title	Role
2005	Magic Warriors Mir & Gaon: The Musical	Gaon
2006	Children Alchemist	Santiago
2012	La Cage Aux Folles	Jean-Michel

=== Social contributions ===
Year	Title	Notes/Ref.
2012	Honorary Ambassador for Youth (Ministry of Gender Equality and Family)	with Kim You-jung
2015	Honorary Ambassador for CAPA (Confederation of Asian and Pacific Accountants)	with f(x)'s Luna
2015	Student Ambassador for Chung-Ang University	with Jin Se-yeon

== Awards and nominations ==
Year	Award	Category	Nominated work	Result
2007	SBS Drama Awards	Best Young Actor	Southern Mom Catch Up	Nominated
2012	MBC Drama Awards	Best Young Actor	Moon Embracing the Sun	Nominated
2019	MBC Drama Awards	Best Supporting Cast in a Wednesday-Thursday Drama	Extraordinary You	Nominated
