= Mayday (April song) =

2017 K-pop song

Single by April
- Released: May 29, 2017
- Recorded: 2017
- Genre: K-pop; bubblegum pop
- Label: DSP Media; LOEN
- Songwriter: E.One

April singles chronology
"Snowman" (2015)	"Mayday" (2017)	"Hello Summer" (2020)

Mayday is the third single album by South Korean girl group April. It was their second comeback in 2017, after releasing their third mini album Prelude in January.

== Background and release ==
On 7 March 2017, it was reported that April had recently started filming a new Mnet reality program set to be broadcast in April 2017. It was also reported that the group is also preparing for a mid-April comeback with plan for the new album to be promoted along with the new show. On 14 March, it was confirmed that the reality program titled "A-IF-Ril" would start airing on 4 April for a total of five episodes.

On 4 April, the group released the surprise tennis court themed MV for their single "Sting" (Korean: 따끔), through the first episode of their reality program "A-IF-Ril".

On 12 April, DSP Media announced that the group's comeback would be postponed until after finishing the filming of their reality program "A-IF-Ril" – the new release goal was set for mid-May.

On 8 May, the group started their second reality program of the year, titled "April Secret" on Naver TV.

On 15 May, DSP Media announced that the group's comeback was set for 29 May with their second single album titled Mayday. On 29 May, the tennis court themed MV for their single "Sting" (Korean: 따끔) was re-released under the title "Lovesick", together with the single's title track "Mayday" and its retro themed MV, followed by a special choreography MV of "Mayday", on 1 June. On June 22, April performed a special stage of "Sting/Lovesick" on Mnet's M Countdown.

== Track listing ==
No.	Title	Lyrics	Music	Length
1.	"따끔 (Lovesick)"	E.One	E.One	3:18
2.	"Mayday"	Chowool	Chowool	2:58
3.	"Yes Sir"	어벤전승, 정재엽	어벤전승, 정재엽	3:00
Total length:				9:16
