= The Ruby =

EP by April
- Released: October 16, 2018
- Recorded: 2018
- Genres: Retro; dance-pop; synth-pop
- Length: 16:26
- Language: Korean
- Labels: DSP Media; Kakao M

April chronology
The Blue (2018)	The Ruby (2018)	Da Capo (2020)

Singles from The Ruby
- 1. "Oh! My Mistake" Released: October 16, 2018

The Ruby is the sixth extended play by South Korean girl group April. It was released on October 16, 2018, by DSP Media. The EP was supported by the "retro" lead single "Oh! My Mistake". The Ruby debuted and peaked at number 10 on the Gaon Album Chart.

== Background and release ==
DSP Media announced the band's comeback for October 16, 2018 on October 4. Being in black and white, Osen noted that the promotional poster differed from April's previous imagery as it lacked any primary colors, and noted that the band had evolved and matured with each release, "adding a variety of changes to every album". Several other publications also noted the change in style.

"Oh! My Mistake" was released along with the EP on October 16, with Billboard calling it a "revitalizing dance track that adds a new side to April's artistry", as well as "unconventional" and describing it as having a "rollicking '80s-esque scattered beat and quirky, cloying lo-fi vocals over vibrant synths". The magazine also said the video "takes the audience back to the yesteryears of VHS tapes, corded phones, and RAZRs".

== Music ==
The EP opens with "Oh-e-Oh", an upbeat tropical song, followed by the lead single "Oh! My Mistake", an "unconventional" retro dance track. "Story", the third song, was called a "whimsical, retro synth-pop tune", and the last original song on the album, "Love Clock", is a pop rock track about the passage of time.

== Commercial performance ==
The Ruby debuted at number 10 on South Korea's Gaon Album Chart, while Oh! My Mistake did not enter the Gaon Digital Chart but entered the component Download Chart at 71. The EP has sold 7,070 physical copies as of November 2018.

== Track listing ==
No.	Title	Length
1.	"Oh-e-Oh"	3:12
2.	"Oh! My Mistake"	3:25
3.	"Story"	3:06
4.	"Love Clock"	3:18
5.	"Oh! My Mistake" (instrumental)	3:25
Total length:		16:26

== Charts ==
Chart (2018)	Peak position
South Korean Albums (Gaon)	10
