= Timeless (Barbra Streisand tour) =

1999–2000 concert tour by Barbra Streisand

- Tour by Barbra Streisand
- Promotional poster for tour
- Start date: December 31, 1999
- End date: September 28, 2000
- Legs: 1
- No. of shows: 6 in North America; 4 in Australia; 10 Total
- Box office: $70 million ($130.87 in 2025 dollars)

Barbra Streisand concert chronology
- Barbra Streisand in Concert (1994); Timeless (1999–2000); Streisand (2006–07)

Timeless was a concert tour by entertainer Barbra Streisand. Following her hotly anticipated Millennium Concert 1999/2000 (which is cited as being part of this tour) Barbra decided to take this concert on the road for an 8-day tour of Australia, Los Angeles & New York. The tour grossed a record-breaking $70 million and drew audiences of 200,000 for only 10 dates.

== History ==
The tour was directed by Streisand and Kenny Ortega and based on the original plan for two New Year's concerts marking the start of the 21st century. The dates were released in April and all tickets sold out within hours of going on sale. Following the success of the millennium concerts, Barbra decided to take the tour on the road and visited Australia for the first time and included Melbourne and Sydney before heading back to America for four other concerts in Los Angeles and New York City. While only ten shows were performed, they were spread over nine months.

== Broadcasts and recordings ==
The week before the final shows Columbia Records released Timeless: Live in Concert, a 2-disc CD of the millennium show that entered the US Billboard charts at number 21 and was certified Platinum by the RIAA. The album includes a credit for Sydney Philharmonia Choirs who recorded backing tracks in March 2000 (the weekend after their live performances with Barbra in Sydney) that were included in this 'live' album. February 2001 saw the DVD release of Timeless, which debuted at Number 1 on the Billboard Top Music Video Sales chart and has been certified Platinum by the RIAA.

== Set list ==
1. "You'll Never Know"
2. "Something's Coming"
3. "The Way We Were"
4. "Cry Me a River"
5. "Lover, Come Back To Me"
6. "A Sleepin' Bee"
7. "Miss Marmelstein"
8. "I'm the Greatest Star" / "Second Hand Rose" / "Don't Rain on My Parade"
9. "Something Wonderful" / "Being Alive"
10. "As Time Goes By" / "Speak Low"
11. "Alfie"
12. "Evergreen"
13. "Papa, Can You Hear Me? / "You'll Never Know"
14. "A Piece of Sky"

Intermission

1. "Putting It Together"
2. "On a Clear Day (You Can See Forever)"
3. "Send In the Clowns"
4. "Happy Days Are Here Again"
5. "Get Happy
6. "Guilty" (with Barry Gibb)
7. "I Finally Found Someone" (with Bryan Adams)
8. "Tell Him" (with Celine Dion)
9. "You Don't Bring Me Flowers" (with Neil Diamond)"
10. "Sing" (with Jason Gould)
11. "I've Got a Crush on You"
12. "The Clicker Blues"
13. "Simple Pleasures"
14. "The Main Event" / "Fight"
15. "I've Dreamed of You"
16. "At the Same Time"
17. "People"
18. "Happy Days Are Here Again"
19. "Don't Like Goodbyes"
20. "I Believe" / "Somewhere"

Set list per official DVD track listing.

== Shows ==
List of concerts, showing date, city, country, venue, tickets sold, number of available tickets and amount of gross revenue
Date	City	Country	Venue	Attendance	Revenue
North America
December 31, 1999	Las Vegas	United States	MGM Grand Garden Arena	15,842 / 15,842	$18,231,213
January 1, 2000	Las Vegas	United States	MGM Grand Garden Arena	15,842 / 15,842	$18,231,213
Australia
March 9, 2000	Sydney	Australia	Sydney Football Stadium	—N/a	—N/a
March 10, 2000	Sydney	Australia	Sydney Football Stadium	—N/a	—N/a
March 15, 2000	Melbourne	Australia	Colonial Stadium	70,000 / 70,000	—N/a
March 17, 2000	Melbourne	Australia	Colonial Stadium	70,000 / 70,000	—N/a
North America
September 20, 2000	Los Angeles	United States	Staples Center	31,284 / 31,284	$12,600,000
September 21, 2000	Los Angeles	United States	Staples Center	31,284 / 31,284	$12,600,000
September 27, 2000	New York City	United States	Madison Square Garden	25,994 / 25,994	$14,393,750
September 28, 2000	New York City	United States	Madison Square Garden	25,994 / 25,994	$14,393,750
Total				143,120 / 143,120	$63,456,176

== Personnel ==
NOTE: Some performers do not appear in person.

- Bryan Adams – vocals
- Robert L. Adcock – celli
- Louis Armstrong – trumpet
- Steve Becknell – french horn
- Douglas Besterman – arranger
- Chris Bishop – engineer
- Peggie Blu – backing vocals
- Chris Boardman – arranger
- Ralph Burns – arranger, adaptation
- Jorge Calandrelli – arranger
- Darius Campo – violin
- Chris Carlton – engineer
- Jon Clarke – woodwind
- John Clayton – arranger
- Don Costa – arranger
- Joe Covello – photography
- Debbie Datz-Pyle – contractor
- Mario de Leon – violin
- Neil Diamond – vocals
- Celine Dion – vocals
- Chuck Domanico – bass
- Bruce Dukov – violin
- Sam Emerson – photography
- Martin Erlichman – executive producer
- Bob Esty – arranger, conductor
- David Ewart – violin
- Peter Fletcher – product manager
- David Foster – arranger
- Bruce Fowler – trombone
- Ian Freebairn-Smith – arranger
- Lauren Frost – vocals
- Matt Funes – viola
- Judy Garland – vocals
- Barry Gibb – vocals
- Phil Gitomer – technical manager
- Savion Glover – actor
- Mark Graham – librarian
- Gary Grant – trumpet
- Dan Greco – percussion
- Henry Grossman – photography
- Marvin Hamlisch – arranger, director
- Jack Hayes – arranger
- Gwen Heller – violin
- Randee Heller – vocals
- Ryan Hewitt – assistant engineer
- Jerry Hey – trumpet
- Dan Higgins – woodwind
- Jim Hoffman – librarian
- Rupert Holmes – arranger
- Carrie Holzman-Little – viola
- Paul Jabara – arranger
- Bruce Jackson – sound design
- Ron Jannelli – woodwind
- Alan Kaplan – trombone
- Eddie Karam – arranger
- Suzie Katayama – celli
- Steve Khan – narrator
- Jay Landers – executive producer
- Alec Ledd – vocals
- Annie Leibovitz – photography
- Brian Leonard – violin
- Warren Leuning – trumpet
- Gayle Levant – harp
- Dane Little – celli
- Charles Loper – trombone
- Jeremy Lubbock – arranger
- Stephen Marcussen – mastering
- Nick Marshall – mixing
- Peter Matz – arranger, producer
- Kevin Mazur – photography
- Ed Meares – bass
- Don Mischer – producer
- Suzette Moriarty – French horn
- Horia Moroaica – violin
- Ralph Morrison – concert master
- Peter Morse – lighting design, lighting director
- Dan Newfeld – viola
- Robin Olson – violin
- Kenny Ortega – writer, assistant director
- Marty Paich – arranger
- Dean Parks – guitar
- Joel Peskin – woodwind
- Barbara Porter – violin
- Sid Ramin – arranger
- Tom Ranier – keyboards
- Gabrielle Raumberger – art direction, design
- Dave Reitzas – mixing
- Nelson Riddle – arranger
- Bruce Roberts – arranger
- Gil Romero – violin
- William James Ross – arranger
- Randee Saint Nicholas – photography
- Mark Sazer – violin
- Walter Scharf – arranger
- Harry Shirinian – viola
- John Simpson – engineer
- Frank Sinatra – vocals
- Kim Skalecki – assistant
- Lew Soloff – trumpet
- Michael Starobin – arranger
- Barbra Streisand – director, vocals, producer, writer
- Neil Stubenhaus – electric bass
- Shari Sutcliffe – project coordinator
- Karen Swenson – consultant, photo research
- Phil Teele – trombone
- Alberto Tolot – photography
- Bob Tricarico – woodwind
- Charles Valentino – actor
- Fred Vogler – engineer
- Jürgen Vollmer – photography
- Randy Waldman – arranger, keyboards
- Brad Warnaar – French horn
- Phil Yao – French horn
- Ken Yerke – violin
- Firooz Zahedi – photography, cover photo
- Patty Zimmitti – contractor
- Robert Zimmitti – percussion
- Torrie Zito – arranger
- Simon Page - Artist Security Director
- David Lindsay - Artist Security
