= Into Eternity =

Into Eternity may refer to:

- Into Eternity (band), a progressive metal band from Regina, Saskatchewan, Canada
- Into Eternity (album), the eponymous debut studio album by the above band
- Into Eternity (film), a 2009 feature documentary film directed by Michael Madsen
