= Da Capo (EP) =

EP by April
- Released: April 22, 2020
- Recorded: 2019–2020
- Venues: Seoul, S. Korea
- Studio: DSP Studios
- Genres: Dance-pop; electropop; synth-pop
- Length: 16:32
- Language: Korean
- Labels: DSP Media; Kakao M

April chronology
The Ruby (2018)	Da Capo (2020)	Hello Summer (2020)

Singles from Da Capo
- 1. "Matter of Time" Released: March 1, 2020; 2. "Lalalilala" Released: April 22, 2020

Music video
- "Lalalilala" on YouTube "Matter of Time" on YouTube

Da Capo is the seventh and final extended play by South Korean girl group April and their first one since 2018's The Ruby. It was released on April 22, 2020, by DSP Media and distributed by Kakao M. The EP features six tracks, including the lead single "Lalalilala" and the previously released CD-only track "Matter of Time", which is a duet between members Naeun and Jinsol. The physical album is available in two versions: "Glitter" and "Suit", making it the group's first release with more than one version. The EP marks the group's second to last release prior to their disbandment on January 28, 2022.

== Background and release ==
Initially, April was set to make a comeback in March 2020 but on March 11, DSP Media announced that the group would postpone their comeback to April 2020 amid the coronavirus concerns. On April 10, a poster teasing the group's comeback was posted which revealed the mini album's title "Da Capo" and the release date, April 22. According to DSP Media, the album's title "Da Capo" is a musical term which means "from the beginning". On April 11, a story film was released, hinting at a sci-fi themed, a surprisingly darker concept compared to April's previous releases. The mini album's title track was revealed to be "Lalalilala". Subsequently, each member's individual teaser and unit teasers were released from April 12 to 19, with the tracklist being revealed on April 16. A music video teaser was posted on April 21.

Da Capo and the music video for "Lalalilala" were released on April 22.

== Composition and reception ==
"Lalalilala" was written and composed by Kang Myeong-shin & moonc, both of whom had worked with April on their previous release. It is an upbeat, disco-influenced EDM track with a repetitive hook, and gets less intense during the verses than the chorus, with a middle-eight rap from members Chaewon, Rachel, and Yena. Upon release, many fans compared "Lalalilala" to April's former labelmates Kara's sound, pointing out the song's grand chorus.

== Promotion ==
The group started promoting "Lalalilala" on April 23, 2020, on Mnet's M Countdown, followed by performances on KBS's Music Bank, MBC's Show! Music Core, and SBS's Inkigayo.

== Commercial performance ==
According to Hanteo, Da Capo sold 3,140 copies on its first day of availability, the highest for the group and higher than The Ruby's first day sales of 227. "LALALILALA" was also April's highest-charting song ever on South Korean music sites, reaching number 1 on Bugs, number 6 on Genie, number 13 on Soribada, and number 37 on Melon, with April topping Melon's Female Group Chart.

With three days of tracking, Da Capo debuted at number 18 on South Korea's Gaon Album Chart, while "Lalalilala" debuted at number 100 on the Gaon Digital Chart on the chart issue dated April 19–25, 2020, making it their first song to enter the chart since 2017's "April Story". The following week, on the chart issue dated April 26-May 2, 2020, Da Capo rose to number 5 on the Album Chart while "Lalalilala" rose to number 40 on the Digital Chart, both becoming the highest-charting releases of April's career.

== Track listing ==
Da Capo track listing
No.	Title	Lyrics	Music	Arrangement	Length
1.	"Oops I'm Sorry"	Kang Myeong-shin; moonc	Kang Myeong-shin; moonc	Kang Myeong-shin; moonc	2:58
2.	"Doll" (인형)	Lee Ha-jin; e.one	e.one	e.one	3:52
3.	"Lalalilala"	Kang Myeong-shin; moonc	Kang Myeong-shin; moonc	Kang Myeong-shin; moonc	3:14
4.	"1,2,3,4"	Seo Ji-eum	Justin Reinstein; Redhead Anne	Justin Reinstein	3:07
5.	"You.zip" (너.zip)	Jung Ho-hyun (e.one); Wooziq; Myo	Jung Ho-hyun (e.one); Wooziq; Myo	Jung Ho-hyun (e.one); Wooziq; Myo	3:21
Total length:					16:32

CD-only track
No.	Title	Lyrics	Music	Arrangement	Length
6.	"Matter of Time" (시간차)	Kim Eana	Kim Hyeong-seok	Jang Ji-won	3:46
Total length:					20:18

== Charts ==
Chart performance for Da Capo
Chart (2020)	Peak position
South Korean Albums (Gaon)	5

Chart performance for "Lalalilala"
Song	Chart (2020)	Peak position
Lalalilala	South Korea (Gaon)	40

"Lalalilala" on monthly charts
Song	Chart (2020)	Peak position
Lalalilala	South Korea (Gaon)	51
