= Walang Hanggan =

Walang Hanggan may refer to:

- Walang Hanggan (2003 TV series), a Philippine telenovela aired on GMA Network, starring Valerie Concepcion and Oyo Boy Sotto
- Walang Hanggan (2012 TV series), a Philippine telenovela aired on ABS-CBN, starring Coco Martin and Julia Montes
- "Hanggang Sa Dulo ng Walang Hanggan", a 1977 OPM song by Basil Valdez

== See also ==
- Walang Hanggang Paalam, a 2020-2021 Philippine drama series
