= Boing Boing (April single album) =

Single album by April
- Released: November 25, 2015
- Recorded: 2015
- Genres: K-pop; bubblegum pop
- Length: 9:37
- Labels: DSP Media; LOEN

April chronology
Boing Boing (2015)	Snowman (2015)

Boing Boing is the debut single album by South Korean girl group April. It marks the first comeback for the group as five members, after the departure of Somin in early November 2015.

== Background and release ==
On November 9, DSP Media has announced that after long discussions, Somin has made the decision to leave the group. On the same day DSP announced that the group will make a comeback in November as a 5-member group.

On November 14, DSP Media posted on April's official instagram account a picture, in the form of a math test, announcing the group's upcoming 1st Single Album. On November 16, a teaser for the logo of their single album Boing Boing was posted on YouTube. On November 17, a group teaser was posted on the group's official instagram account. On November 18, the agency revealed several group pictures, as well as individual photos of the band members, revealing a scout concept. On November 19, DSP Media posted a series of pictures for a second concept. On November 20, the agency posted pictures from the MV filming and revealed that the song promoted by the group would be called "Muah!". On 23 November, a video teaser for "Muah!" was posted. On November 24, a preview of the two title component of Boing Boing was revealed. On 25 November, the music video for "Muah!" was posted on the official YouTube channel of the group, as well as behind the scenes footage and an interview.

== Track listing ==
No.	Title	Lyrics	Music	Length
1.	"유리성 (Glass Castle)"	E.One	E.One	3:31
2.	"Muah!"	Mafly, The Sunday	Machwave, 이준엽	3:03
3.	"Muah! (Instrumental)"		Machwave, 이준엽	3:03
Total length:				9:37
