= Timeless (Monir novel) =

2011 novel by Alexandra Monir

- Cover of Timeless
- Author: Alexandra Monir
- Cover artist: Charlotte Williams
- Language: English
- Series: Timeless
- Genre: Romance science fiction
- Publisher: Random House Children's Books
- Publication date: January 2011
- Publication place: United States
- Media type: Print (Hardcover)
- Pages: 304
- ISBN: 0-385-73838-2
- Followed by: The Timekeeper

Timeless is a 2011 young-adult urban fantasy romance novel written by Alexandra Monir. It was originally published in January 2011, by Random House Children's Publishing. The book centers on Michele Windsor, who accidentally begins to travel through time and meet her ancestors as well as a love interest. It is the first book in the Timeless series. The second book, The Timekeeper, was published in January 2013.

== Plot ==
Michele Windsor is a teenager with two best friends and a single mom. For years, she has had a dream in which she looks in a mirror and sees herself wearing a key around her neck while holding hands with a handsome young man. After her mother dies in a car accident, Michele is sent to live with her previously estranged grandparents, who are Windsors of high society in New York that Michele's mother had distanced herself from when they didn't approve of Henry, the artist she was in love with. The pair ran away together, but Henry disappeared under mysterious circumstances and Michele's mother discovers she is pregnant. Instead of turning to her parents, she vows to raise her child herself, on her own means.

Michele has the typical new kid reaction to her new school and life, and though she is immediately swept up into the higher class snob club because of her last name, she ends up shunning them and hanging out with Cassie and Aaron, the scholarship kids who are much more down to earth. Cassie, who lives next door to the Windsor mansion (in a house that used to be part of the Walker estate), eventually becomes her best friend, and covers for her when Michele starts taking mysterious and sudden trips into the past, thanks to the key from her dream that she finds in her mother’s old possessions.

Being dashed back and forth between centuries, Michele appears to various members of her family who are long dead. They can see her, but no one else can, aside from one—the mysterious man from her dream, who is a Walker and engaged to her great great aunt Violet. She is drawn to him, and he to her. Michele learns his name is Philip Walker and despite their strange circumstances, they fall in love, causing Philip to break off his engagement with Violet and start a family feud between the two households that Michele had previously learned about from her history class.

Michele's visits to the past, at times prompted by old items from certain years and at times she is merely dragged, continue as she helps members of her family through difficult times and meets Philip for romantic moments. She learns Philip is a talented piano player and composer who would rather go to the New York school that will become Juilliard rather than Harvard Business School and take over the family business. She urges him to follow his heart, and together they write two songs that she pens the lyrics to.

== Main characters ==
- Michele Windsor: A sixteen-year-old girl whose mother is estranged from her socialite parents. With the death of her mother, she goes to live with her grandparents and is entered into more than one new world.
- Philip Walker: A young composer and heir to the Walker family business. He falls in love with Michele.
- Caissie: Michele’s new best friend in New York, who lives next door. She isn’t rich but goes to the same school as Michele on a scholarship.
- Clara: Michele’s great great aunt, who is adopted into the Windsor family, allegedly as the daughter of a deceased friend, though she is actually a Windsor daughter as well.
- Violet: Michele’s snotty great great aunt, who is engaged to Philip Walker before he meets Michele.
- Lily: Michele’s great grandmother, and a music legend.
- Stella: Lily’s niece, whose fiance is killed on D-day.

== Media ==
The two songs written by Michele and Philip in the book are available for download in accompaniment of the book. Both tunes, "Bring the Colors Back" and "Chasing Time", were written and performed by Alexandra Monir.

== Critical reception ==
Ann Reddy Damon from VOYA noted, "While the novel suffers from some incredulity in the time traveling, it is a good read for teens looking for a love story." Timeless was named one of Amazon.com's Best Books of the Month in January 2011.
