= The Blue (April EP) =

- Digital cover

EP by April
- Released: March 12, 2018
- Recorded: 2018
- Studios: DSP Studios (Seoul, S. Korea)
- Genres: K-pop; R&B
- Language: Korean
- Labels: DSP Media; LOEN

April chronology
Eternity (2017)	The Blue (2018)	The Ruby (2018)

Singles from The Blue
- 1. "The Blue Bird" Released: March 12, 2018

Music video
- "The Blue Bird" on YouTube

The Blue is the fifth extended play by South Korean girl group April. It was released on March 12, 2018 by DSP Media and distributed by LOEN Entertainment. This EP consists of six track including the title track "The Blue Bird".

== Background and release ==
On February 26, 2018, DSP Media confirmed that April's comeback was set for March 12. On February 27, the agency released the comeback schedule for the album. On February 28, the album's track list was revealed.

On March 1, DSP Media released the first set of the member's individual teaser images, followed on March 2, by the second set of individual teaser images. On March 6, a whispered lyrics spoiler video was released. On March 7, the MV teaser for the lead single "The Blue Bird" was posted on the group's YouTube channel. On March 9, the highlight medley for the album was released. The official video for "The Blue Bird" was posted on the group's YouTube channel on March 12.

== Track listing ==
No.	Title	Lyrics	Music	Arrangement	Length
1.	"The Blue Bird" (파랑새)	e.one	e.one	e.one	3:15
2.	"Beep"	이하진, 정호현(e.one), 최현준	정호현(e.one), 최현준	정호현(e.one), 최현준	3:35
3.	"Angel Song"	윤영민, 노는어린이	윤영민, 노는어린이	윤영민, 이빛나	3:35
4.	"Hide and Seek" (숨바꼭질)	송양하, 김동열, Brandnewjiq	송양하, 김동열, Brandnewjiq	송양하, 김동열, Brandnewjiq	3:20
5.	"Stand By Me" (아쉬워)	남기상, ANY MASINGGA, 권선익	남기상, ANY MASINGGA	ANY MASINGGA	3:35
6.	"The Blue Bird (Inst.)" (파랑새)		정호현(e.one)	정호현(e.one)	3:15
Total length:					20:35

== Release history ==
Region	Date	Format	Label	Ref.
South Korea	March 12, 2018	CD; digital download	DSP Media; LOEN Entertainment	
Various	March 12, 2018	Digital download	DSP Media; LOEN Entertainment	
