= Snowman (April song) =

Single by April
- Released: December 21, 2015
- Recorded: 2015
- Genre: Christmas
- Length: 6:10
- Label: DSP Media; LOEN

April singles chronology
"Boing Boing" (2015)	"Snowman" (2015)	"Mayday" (2017)

Music video
- "Snowman" on YouTube

Snowman is the first special album by the South Korean girl group April. This marks their first winter album release.

== Background and release ==
On December 10, it was announced that the group would release a special winter single album titled Snowman on December 21, and posted puzzle teaser images to the group's Facebook, Twitter, Instagram, and Fan cafe. On December 31, a special choreography music video for "Snowman" was posted on the group's official YouTube channel.

== Track listing ==
No.	Title	Lyrics	Music	Length
1.	"Snowman"	이주형, 박아셀, 김유석	이주형, 박아셀, 김유석	3:05
2.	"Snowman (Instrumental)"		이주형, 박아셀, 김유석	3:05
Total length:				6:10
