= Eternity (April EP) =

EP by April
- Released: September 20, 2017
- Recorded: 2017
- Genres: K-pop; synth-pop; R&B
- Language: Korean
- Labels: DSP Media; LOEN

April chronology
Prelude (2017)	Eternity (2017)	The Blue (2018)

Music video
- Take My Hand on YouTube

Eternity is the fourth extended play by South Korean girl group April, released on September 20, 2017, by DSP Media and distributed by LOEN Entertainment.

== Background and release ==
In August, the group revealed during an interview with "International BnT" that they were already preparing for their next album, with the goal for a comeback before the end of the year. On August 23, DSP Media announced that the group's comeback was set for some time in September. On September 5, DSP Media announced that the group's comeback had been set for September 20 with an album titled Eternity. On September 5, DSP Media revealed the album's track list, confirming Eternity to be April's fourth mini-album, accompanied by the lead single "Take My Hand" (Korean: 손을 잡아줘).

== Commercial performance ==
Eternity debuted at number 7 on the Gaon Album Chart, on the chart issue dated September 17–23, 2017.

== Track listing ==
No.	Title	Lyrics	Music	Arrangement	Length
1.	"Take My Hand" (손을 잡아줘)	e.one	e.one	e.one	3:30
2.	"Tting" (띵)	어벤전승, e.one	어벤전승, e.one		3:13
3.	"Magic in Love"	Seion	Seion		3:33
4.	"Hey Yo Hey"	Lee Joo-hyung (MonoTree)	MonoTree, 권덕근		3:23
5.	"Zzi Rit Zzi Rit" (찌릿찌릿)	ZigZagNote, 노는어린이	ZigZagNote, 노는어린이		3:01
6.	"Shall We Love" (사랑해도 될까요)	이신성	ZigZagNote		3:37
Total length:					20:22

== Charts ==
Chart (2017)	Peak position
South Korean Albums (Gaon)	7

== Release history ==
Region	Date	Format	Label	Ref.
South Korea	September 20, 2017	CD; digital download	DSP Media; LOEN Entertainment	
Various	September 20, 2017	Digital download	DSP Media; LOEN Entertainment	
