= April (South Korean group) =

South Korean girl group

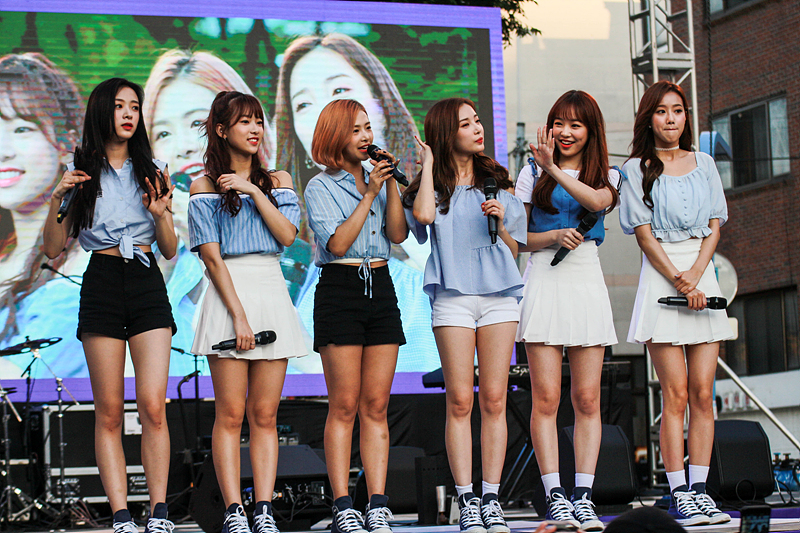
- April in August 2018; From left to right: Jinsol, Yena, Chaewon, Chaekyung, Rachel, and Naeun

Background information
- Origin: Seoul, South Korea
- Genre: K-pop
- Years active: 2015–2022
- Label: DSP
- Past members: Chaekyung; Somin; Chaewon; Hyunjoo; Naeun; Yena; Rachel; Jinsol

April (Korean: 에이프릴) was a South Korean girl group formed by DSP Media. The group debuted on August 24, 2015, with their EP Dreaming and its title track "Dream Candy". The group's final lineup was composed of six members: Chaekyung, Chaewon, Naeun, Yena, Rachel, and Jinsol. The group officially disbanded on January 28, 2022.

== Name ==
The group name is made up of 'A' and 'pril'. 'A' means 'the best girl group' and 'pril' means lovely girls. As combined, 'April' makes the meaning of 'the best, lovely girls'. Also known as 'Sa-wori' (사월이, April), 'Apple' (에플, pun of April) or 'Pril-e' (프릴이, pun of pril). After their debut, fans started calling them 'Chung-jeong-dol' (청정돌, pure idol).

== History ==
=== 2015: Debut and Somin's departure ===
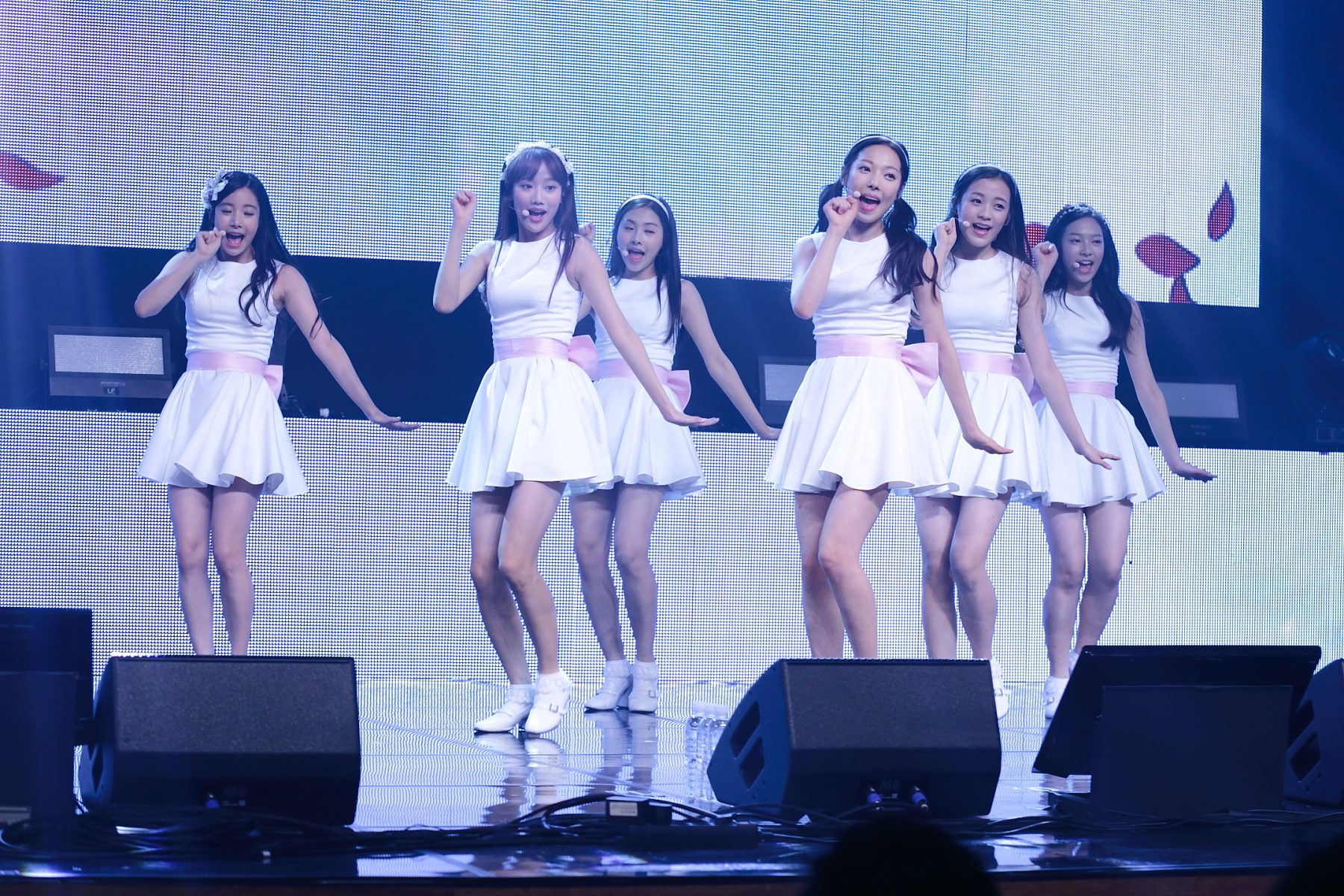
April during their first official performance on August 25, 2015, on The Show

April's formation was first announced by DSP Media on February 9, 2015, following their previous girl groups Fin.K.L, Kara and Rainbow. The six-member group (Somin, Chaewon, Hyunjoo, Naeun, Yena, and Jinsol) debuted on August 24 with the EP Dreaming and the title track "Dream Candy" (Korean: 꿈사탕).

On November 9, the group's leader, Somin announced her departure from April through a handwritten letter posted on the group’s fan café. In the letter, she expressed gratitude to the members and fans, and explained she wanted to pursue personal growth and study things she could do better as an individual. DSP Media confirmed her departure and stated she would continue activities as a solo artist under the agency; she would later go on to debut in the co-ed group KARD. The remaining five members released the single album Boing Boing, including the title track "Muah!" and the B-side "Glass Castle" on November 25. It was followed by a Christmas special album titled Snowman, released on December 21.

=== 2016: Spring and line-up changes ===
On February 12, 2016, DSP Media announced that the group's fan club name was "Fineapple" (Korean: 파인에플). On February 14, the group hold a mini-concert titled "Everland Romantic Concert" for Valentine's Day. On February 18, April won the Girl Group Rookie of the Year award at the 22nd Korean Entertainment Arts Awards.

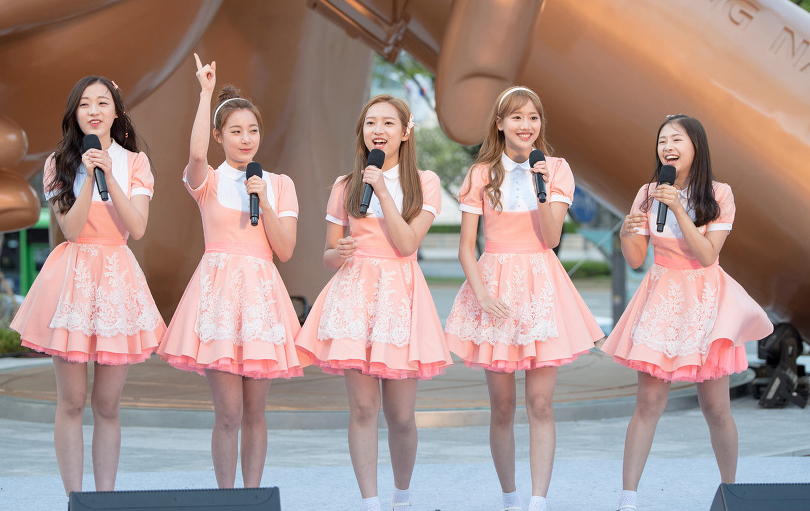
April performing a few days prior to the release of Spring

The group's second EP, Spring, was released on April 27. It contains six tracks including the lead single, "Tinkerbell" (Korean: 팅커벨). During promotions for Spring, Hyunjoo took a temporary hiatus from the group due to health issues, and April promoted as a four-member group.

On August 21, the group held their first solo concert, titled Dream Land, at the Baek Am Art Hall in Seoul, to celebrate their first anniversary. Another concert was held in Tokyo, Japan, on October 15. Yoon Chae-kyung also participated in both concerts as a guest member.

On October 29, Hyunjoo announced her departure from April, following a seven-month hiatus, in order to pursue an acting career. New group members were confirmed in November: Chaekyung, who had previously appeared as a guest member, and Rachel.

=== 2017: Prelude, Mayday and Eternity ===
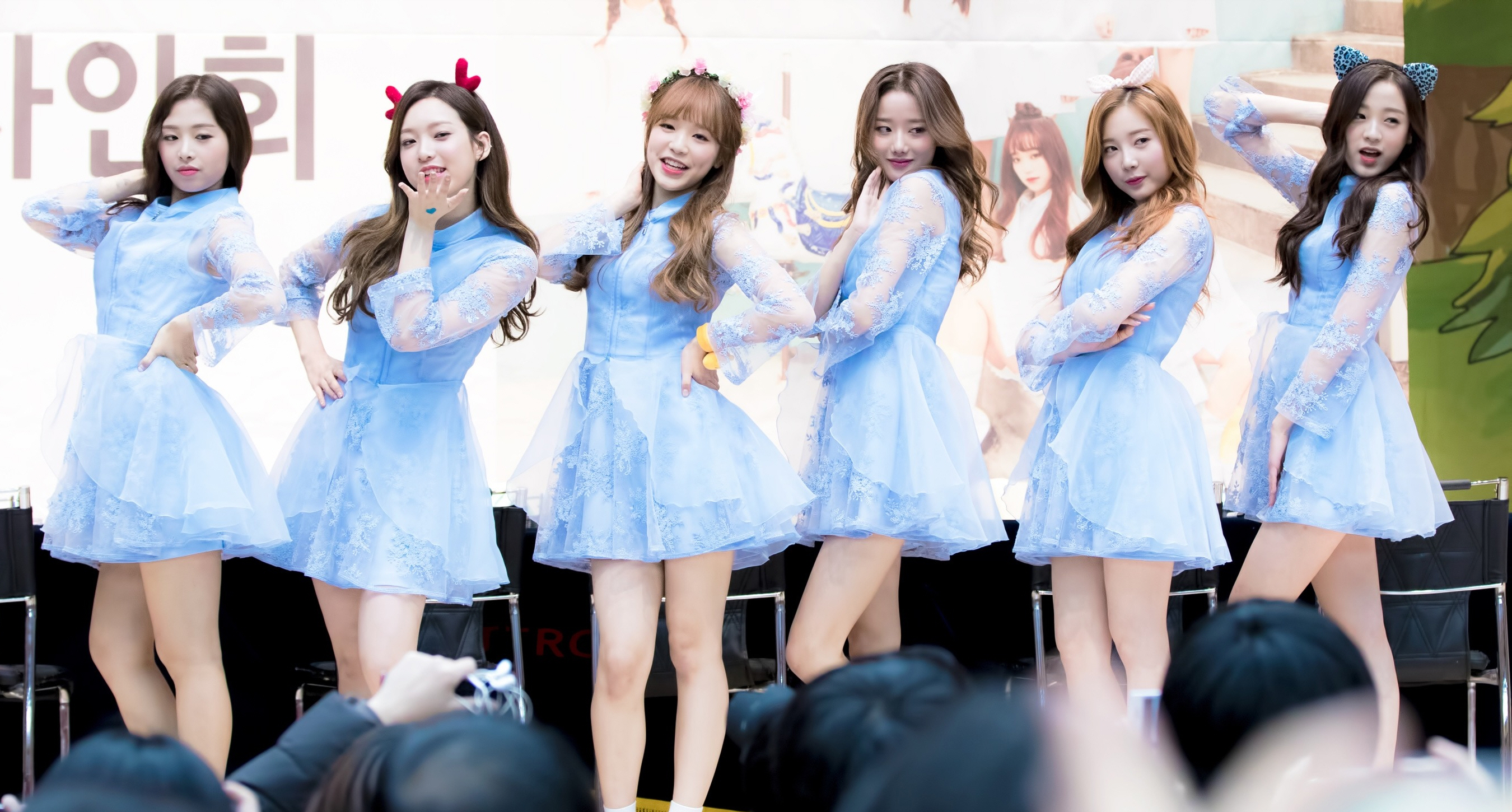
APRIL during a fan-sign, on January 15, 2017

April released their third EP Prelude as a six-member group on January 3, 2017, with the title track "April Story" (Korean: 봄의 나라 이야기). The group also held their comeback showcase performance for Prelude on the same day. On February 14, they performed a cover of Apink's "Luv" for the 100th episode of The Show. From February 16, they also performed on M Countdown with the track "Wow". On February 26, they released "So You" as a digital single. On March 20, April held their second Japanese fan-meeting titled "[#April Japan Fanmeeting 2017～April Story～]" at Shinagawa Intercity Hall, Tokyo.

On April 4, they released the tennis-court-themed music video for the single "Sting", through the first episode of their reality program A-IF-Ril. The program aired for five episodes. On May 8, the group's second reality program of the year, April Secret, began airing on Naver TV.

On May 29, April released their second single album, Mayday. The music video for "Sting" was re-released under the title "Lovesick", along with the title track "Mayday". They performed "Lovesick" on M Countdown on June 22.

On September 20, their fourth EP Eternity was released along with the title track "Take My Hand" .

On October 18, it was announced that the group will hold their second Japanese solo concert titled "April 2nd Live Concert in Japan 2017 「Dream Land」 (Take My Hand)" on December 10, 2017. The group also performed a concert in Korea on Christmas Day titled "2017 SPECIAL CHRISTMAS APRIL EVE".

=== 2018: The Blue, Japanese debut and The Ruby ===
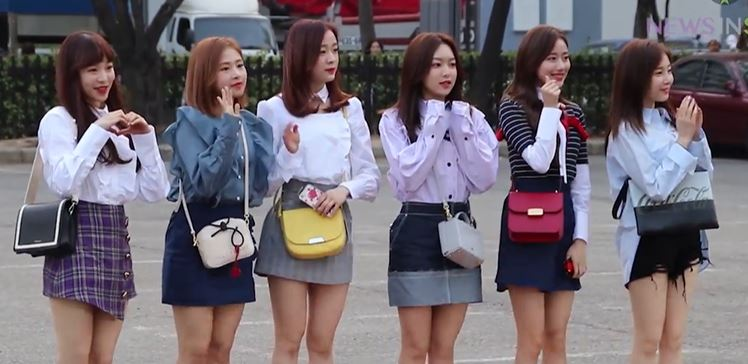
April on the way to Music Bank, on March 18, 2018.

On January 30, 2018, DSP Media through the group's Twitter revealed the upcoming secret single set to release for February 7. On January 31, the agency revealed that the single was to be part of a special unit album. On February 1, it was revealed that the upcoming subunit consisting of members Jinsol and Naeun would release a song "My Story".

On February 26, 2018, DSP Media confirms that April's full group comeback was set for March 12, with the group's fifth EP The Blue along with the title track "The Blue Bird" .

On March 22, DSP Media announced that April was set to make its Japanese debut sometime during the following month. The group made their Japanese debut on April 25 with the release of the Japanese version of their 2016 single "Tinkerbell". The single also contains the Japanese version of the b-side track "Yes, sir!" as well as the instrumental version of both songs. The single was promoted through TV shows appearances and a series of fan-meetings in various cities of Japan.

On September 17, the news outlet OSEN released an exclusive report about APRIL making a fall comeback. The reports were later confirmed by the group's youngest member Jinsol who revealed during an interview that the group was indeed preparing for a comeback. On October 4, DSP Media confirmed that the group would come back with their sixth EP The Ruby. The album was released on October 16, along with the title track "Oh! My Mistake".

=== 2019–2020: Japanese comeback, Da Capo, and Hello Summer ===
On January 16, 2019, April released the single "Oh-E-Oh (Japanese ver.)". In the same month, they released "Magic Dream" for the television drama My Strange Hero.

On March 11, 2020, DSP Media announced that April would postpone their March comeback to April 2020 amid the coronavirus concerns. On April 10, it was revealed that April would make a comeback with their 7th EP titled Da Capo on April 22. According to DSP Media, "Da Capo" is a musical term which means "from the beginning". On April 22, Da Capo and its title track "Lalalilala" were released. Da Capo peaked at number five on the Gaon Album Chart, while "Lalalilala" peaked at number 40 on the Gaon Digital Chart, becoming their highest-charting releases to date.

On July 14, 2020, DSP Media announced that April would make a summer comeback with the special single album Hello Summer on July 29, with the title track "Now or Never".

=== 2021–2022: Bullying accusations and disbandment ===
On February 28, 2021, a post was made to an online forum by someone claiming to be former member Hyunjoo's brother. In the post, he claimed that Hyunjoo's departure from the group had not been because she wanted to study acting, but because she had been forced out due to being severely bullied by the other members, at one point even attempting suicide. DSP Media has denied that any bullying took place, and announced they would be pursuing legal action against Hyunjoo and her family. As a result, the group has faced heavy backlash, up to and including having members removed from endorsement deals and acting roles. Hyunjoo then posted a statement on her personal Instagram on April 18, 2021, backing the claims of the two netizens who made the accusations. She also stated that the label, DSP Media, was not allowing her to terminate her exclusive contract with them.

On January 28, 2022, after a year of no activities, and following the acquisition of DSP by RBW Entertainment on January 26, DSP Media announced that April has decided to disband after six years and go their separate ways. The decision was made after a long discussion and deliberation.

== Members ==
Former

- Somin (소민) (2015)
- Hyunjoo (현주) (2015–2016)
- Chaekyung (채경) (2016–2022)
- Chaewon (채원) (2015–2022)
- Naeun (나은) (2015–2022)
- Yena (예나) (2015–2022)
- Rachel (레이첼) (2016–2022)
- Jinsol (진솔) (2015–2022)

== Discography ==
=== Extended plays ===
- Dreaming (2015)
- Spring (2016)
- Prelude (2017)
- Eternity (2017)
- The Blue (2018)
- The Ruby (2018)
- Da Capo (2020)

== Filmography ==
=== Television ===
Year	Title	TV network
2015	Here Goes April	Naver V Channel
2016	Daily APRIL	AfreecaTV
2017	A-IF-Ril	Mnet
2017	April Secret	Naver V Channel

== Awards and nominations ==
Name of the award ceremony, year presented, category, nominee of the award, and the result of the nomination
Award ceremony	Year	Category	Nominee / work	Result	Ref.
Brand of the Year Awards	2020	Rising Star Award - Female Group	April	Won	
Gaon Chart Music Awards	2016	New Artist of the Year	April	Nominated	
Korea Brand Awards	2016	Star of Tomorrow, Rising Star Award	April	Won	
Korean Culture & Entertainment Awards	2017	K-Pop Artist Award	April	Won	
Korean Culture & Entertainment Awards	2018	K-Pop Artist Award	April	Won	
Korean Entertainment Art Awards	2016	Female Rookie of the Year	April	Won	
Seoul Music Awards	2016	Bonsang Award	April	Nominated	
Seoul Music Awards	2016	Rookie of the Year	April	Nominated	
Seoul Music Awards	2016	Popularity Award	April	Nominated	
Seoul Music Awards	2016	Hallyu Special Award	April	Nominated	
Seoul Music Awards	2021	Bonsang Award	April	Nominated	
Seoul Music Awards	2021	K-wave Popular Award	April	Nominated	
Seoul Music Awards	2021	Popularity Award	April	Nominated	
Seoul Music Awards	2022	U+Idol Live Best Artist Award	April	Nominated	
