= Spring (April EP) =

- Digital cover and stylized edition and spring version.

EP by April
- Released: April 27, 2016
- Recorded: 2016
- Genres: K-pop; bubblegum pop
- Language: Korean
- Labels: DSP Media; LOEN

April chronology
Dreaming (2015)	Spring (2016)	Prelude (2017)

Singles from Spring
- 1. "Tinkerbell" Released: April 27, 2016

Music video
- "Tinkerbell" on YouTube

Spring is the second extended play by South Korean girl group, April. The album was released digitally and physically on April 27, 2016 by DSP Media and distributed by LOEN Entertainment. It contains six tracks, including the lead single, "Tinkerbell". It marks the last release with Hyunjoo prior to her departure from the group on October 29, 2016 due to health issues and also to focus on her acting career.

== Background and release ==
On April 4, DSP Media announced through a teaser poster that the group would make a comeback, on April 27. The poster shows a frame of flowers with texts on the inside and a drawing reminiscent of a butterfly wing. DSP Media also revealed various photos and video teasers for their Spring album.

The concept for this album is a fairy-tale concept, using different flowers that is linked to the group's name "A.P.R.I.L": A is for "Apricot Blossom", P is for "Peony", R is for "Rose", I is for "Island Poppies" and L is for "Lily".

The album and music video for "Tinkerbell" was released on April 27, 2016.

== Promotion ==
The group held a comeback showcase for Spring on April 27, 2016 at the Lottecard Art Center, the showcase was also aired at Naver's V App. The group started their first week of promotion, and made their first music show performance on Mnet's M! Countdown with "Tinkerbell" on April 28. It was eventually followed by appearances on KBS's Music Bank, MBC's Show! Music Core and SBS's Inkigayo.

On May 12, DSP Media announced that member Hyunjoo will temporarily halt all her activities with the group. According to the agency, Hyunjoo has been suffering from breathing problems and frequent headaches, which have made it difficult for her to perform on music shows. As Hyunjoo’s health is their utmost priority, they have decided to make her rest for the time being, and the group continued promoting Spring with only 4 members.

== Track listing ==
No.	Title	Lyrics	Music	Arrangement	Length
1.	"Wake Up"	ZigZag Note	ZigZag Note	ZigZag Note	3:17
2.	"Tinkerbell" (팅커벨)	e.one	e.one	e.one	3:21
3.	"M.F.B.F. (To My Future Boyfriend)" (내 미래의 남자친구에게)	G-High, Lee Joo-hyung (MonoTree)	G-High, Lee Joo-hyung (MonoTree)	G-High, Lee Joo-hyung (MonoTree)	2:58
4.	"When I Open My Eyes" (눈을 뜨면)	SEION	SEION	SEION	3:50
5.	"Jelly"	e.one	e.one	e.one	3:44
6.	"Tinkerbell" (instrumental)		e.one	e.one	3:21
Total length:					20:41
