= Prelude (EP) =

EP by April
- Released: January 4, 2017
- Recorded: 2016
- Genres: K-pop; synth-pop; R&B
- Length: 30:04
- Language: Korean
- Labels: DSP Media; LOEN

April chronology
Spring (2016)	Prelude (2017)	Eternity (2017)

Singles from Prelude
- 1. "April Story" Released: January 4, 2017

Music video
- "April Story" on YouTube

Prelude is the third Korean extended play by South Korean girl group April. Released on January 4, 2017 by DSP Media and distributed by LOEN Entertainment. It marks the group's first comeback as a six member-group with the addition of Chaekyung and Rachel.

== Background and release ==
On December 20, 2016, DSP Media confirmed that April would release their third extended play, Prelude on January 4, 2017. The title of the album Prelude represent the group's new beginning, with their new line-up consisting of members Chaekyung, Chaewon, Naeun, Yena, Rachel and Jinsol. The next day, the album's tracklist was released, revealing that the album will includes 9 tracks with 5 new songs, a re-recorded version of 3 of their previous tracks: "Dream Candy", "Muah!" and "Snowman", and an instrumental version of the title track.

On December 27, they revealed two concept images. On December 28, April released a teaser with member Rachel for showing the choreography key point dance moves and also revealed that the title track of the album, "April Story".

On December 30, their music video making teasers for Jinsol, Chaekyung and Rachel were revealed, followed by Naeun, Chaewon and Yena's on December 31. On January 1, 2017, the highlight medley of the five new songs from the mini-album was released.

== Promotions ==
From January 1 to January 3, Chaekyung, Chaewon, Naeun, Yena, Rachel and Jinsol held a series of live appearances on their V Live channel. On January 3, the music video for "April Story" was released on the group's YouTube channel.

On January 4, the group also held a live aired comeback showcase for Prelude, on V Live. On January 6, April had their comeback stage on KBS's Music Bank that were eventually followed by appearances on Mnet's M Countdown, MBC's Show! Music Core and SBS's Inkigayo.

On January 19, the Special choreography MV of "April Story" was released.

On February 14, 2017, Chaekyung, Chaewon, Naeun, Yena, Rachel and Jinsol performed a special stage of Apink's "LUV" for the 100th episode of SBS MTV The Show. Starting from February 16, the group performed, on Mnet's, M! Countdown, a series of special stages of "WOW" a song also figuring on the Prelude album.

== Track listing ==
No.	Title	Lyrics	Music	Arrangement	Length
1.	"April Story" (봄의 나라 이야기; Bomeh Nara Iyagi)	e.one	e.one	e.one	3:23
2.	"Just As We Are" (지금 모습 이대로; Jigeum Moseub Idaero)	Lee Shin-seong	ZigZag Note	ZigZag Note	3:18
3.	"Time Machine" (시간아 멈춰라; Sigana Meomchwora)	AVGS	AVGS	AVGS	3:21
4.	"Wow"	Kim Boa (Spica), G-High, Lee Joo-hyung (MonoTree)	G-High, Lee Joo-hyung (MonoTree)	G-High, Lee Joo-hyung (MonoTree)	3:17
5.	"Fine Thank You"	Song Yang-ha, Kim Dong-yeol, Brand Newsic	Song Yang-ha, Kim Dong-yeol, Brand Newsic	Song Yang-ha, Kim Dong-yeol, Brand Newsic	3:24
6.	"Dream Candy" (꿈사탕; Kkumsatang; Special ver.)	ButterFly	ButterFly	ButterFly	4:04
7.	"Muah!" (Special ver.)	Mafly, The Sunday	Machwave, Lee Jun-yeob	Machwave, Lee Jun-yeob	3:13
8.	"Snowman" (Special ver.)	Lee Joo-hyung	Lee Joon-hyung, Asle Park, Kim Yoo-seok	Asle Park, Kim Yoo-seok	3:05
9.	"April Story" (instrumental)		e.one	e.one	3:27
Total length:					30:04

== Release history ==
Region	Date	Format	Label	Ref.
South Korea	January 4, 2017	CD; digital download	DSP Media; LOEN Entertainment	
Various	January 4, 2017	Digital download	DSP Media; LOEN Entertainment	
