= Dreaming (EP) =

EP by April
- Released: August 24, 2015
- Recorded: 2015
- Genres: K-pop; bubblegum pop
- Length: 20:41
- Language: Korean
- Labels: DSP Media; LOEN

April chronology
Dreaming (2015)	Spring (2016)

Singles from Dreaming
- 1. "Dream Candy" Released: August 24, 2015

Dreaming is the debut extended play by South Korean girl group April. The album was released digitally and physically on August 24, 2015 and contains six tracks with the lead single, "Dream Candy". It marks leader Somin's only release prior to her departure from the group on November 9, 2015 due to her wish of continuing with her studies.

== Background and release ==
On February 9, 2015, DSP media announced that they will debut a girl group that will be the next generation of Fin.K.L and Kara.

In July 2015, DSP Media announced the members of April through a series of teasers along with the group's logo and mascot, which was chosen through an open logo contest. In early August 2015, DSP Media confirmed that April would debut on August 24 with the mini-album Dreaming.

== Promotion ==
On August 24, 2015, the group debuted through Naver's V App through their showcase "April Debut Showcase–Live", during which they released the mini-album Dreaming.

On August 24, 2015, April released the music video for the EP's lead single, "Dream Candy" (Korean: 꿈사탕). They had their debut stage on the show on August 25. On September 11, 2015, April released a special choreography music video of lead single "Dream Candy", filmed in downtown Seoul.

== Track listing ==
No.	Title	Lyrics	Music	Arrangement	Length
1.	"Dream Candy" (꿈사탕)	ButterFly	ButterFly	ButterFly	3:45
2.	"Hurry Hurry"	Lee Joo-Hyoung (이주형)(MonoTree), Kim Yu-seok (김유석)(MonoTree)	Lee Joo-Hyoung (이주형)(MonoTree), Kim Yu-seok (김유석)(MonoTree)	Lee Joo-Hyoung (이주형)(MonoTree), Kim Yu-seok (김유석)(MonoTree)	3:34
3.	"Knock Knock"	Song Yang-ha (송양하), Kim Jae-hyun (김재현)	Song Yang-ha (송양하), Kim Jae-hyun (김재현)	Song Yang-ha (송양하), Kim Jae-hyun (김재현)	3:20
4.	"Feeling" (느낌)	Nam Ki-sang (남기상), Kang Jeon-myeong (강전명)	Nam Ki-sang (남기상), Mi-ho (미호), Kwon Seon-ik (권선익)	Kwon Seon-ik (권선익)	3:20
5.	"Luv Me x3"	하라는, Ricky (리키)	하라는, Ricky (리키)	하라는, Ricky (리키)	3:22
6.	"Thriller" (스릴러)	Shin Seung-ik (신승익), Denis Seo (Seogy)	Shin Seung-ik (신승익), Denis Seo (Seogy)	Shin Seung-ik (신승익), Denis Seo (Seogy)	3:22
Total length:					20:41

== Release history ==
Region	Date	Format	Label
Various	August 24, 2015	Digital download, CD	DSP Media, LOEN Entertainment
South Korea	August 24, 2015	Digital download, CD	DSP Media, LOEN Entertainment
