= Forever =

Forever or 4ever may refer to:

== Film and television ==
=== Films ===
- Forever (1921 film), an American silent film by George Fitzmaurice
- Forever (1978 film), an American made-for-television romantic drama, based on the novel by Judy Blume
- Forever (1992 film), an American film starring Sean Young and Terrence Knox
- Forever (1994 film), a Filipino film starring Aga Muhlach and Mikee Cojuangco
- Forever (2003 film), an Italian film starring Giancarlo Giannini and Francesca Neri
- Forever, a 2005 Belgian comedy short, winner of a 2005 Joseph Plateau Award
- Forever, a 2008 Slovenian film by Damjan Kozole
- Forever (2015 film), an American film directed by Tatia Pilieva
- Forever (2023 film), a Swedish coming-of-age sports drama

=== Television ===
==== Series ====
- Forever (Philippine TV series), a 2013 drama series
- Forever (2014 TV series), an American fantasy crime drama series
- Forever (2018 TV series), an American comedy-drama streaming series
- Forever (2025 TV series), an American adaptation of the novel by Judy Blume
- Forever (Dutch TV series), a 2018–2019 series

==== Episodes ====
- "Forever" (The Bear), 2024
- "Forever" (Buffy the Vampire Slayer), 2001
- "Forever" (CSI), 2003
- "Forever" (House), 2006
- "Forever" (Smallville), 2005
- "Forever" (VisionQuest), 2026
- "Forever" (Younger), 2019

== Literature ==
- Forever... (novel), 1975, by Judy Blume
- Forever, a 2002 novel by Jude Deveraux
- Forever, a 2003 novel by Pete Hamill
- Forever, a 2011 novel in the Wolves of Mercy Falls series by Maggie Stiefvater
- Forever, an imprint of Grand Central Publishing

== Music ==
=== Artists ===
- Forever (group) or School Gyrls, an American girl group

=== Albums ===
- Forever (Aled Jones album) or the title song, 2011
- Forever (Alesso album), 2015
- Forever (Beautiful World album) or the title song, 1996
- Forever (Bobby Brown album) or the title song, 1997
- Forever (Bon Jovi album), 2024
- Forever (Charly Bliss album), 2024
- Forever (Cher album), 2024
- Forever (Code Orange album) or the title song, 2017
- Forever (Corea, Clarke & White album), 2011
- Forever (Cracker album) or the title song, 2002
- Forever (Cranes album), 1993
- Forever (Damage album) or the title song (see below), 1997
- Forever (Donell Jones album) or the title song, 2013
- Forever (Dune album) or the title song, 1997
- Forever (Flight Facilities album) or the title song, 2021
- Forever (Grailknights album) or the title song, 2025
- Forever (GusGus album) or the title song, 2007
- Forever (John Conlee album) or the title song, 1979
- Forever (Kool & the Gang album) or the title song, 1986
- Forever (Lilly Hiatt album) or the title song, 2025
- Forever (Medina album) or the title song (see below), 2012
- Forever (Mystery Skulls album) or the title song, 2014
- Forever (Ofra Haza album), 2008
- Forever (Orleans album) or the title song, 1979
- Forever (Phife Dawg album) or the title song, 2022
- Forever (Popcaan album), 2018
- Forever (Puff Daddy album) or the title song, 1999
- Forever... (Quo Vadis album), 1996
- Forever (R.K.M & Ken-Y album) or the title song, 2011
- Forever (Rex Smith album), 1979
- Forever (Rosa Chemical album), 2020
- Forever (S.H.E album), 2006
- Forever (Sleep ∞ Over album), 2011
- Forever (Spice Girls album), 2000
- Forever (Ute Lemper album), 2014
- Forever (Slim Whitman album), 1962
- Forever: An Anthology, by Judy Collins, 1997
- Forever: Rich Thugs, Book One, by Above the Law, 1999
- Forever: The Singles, by the Charlatans, or the title song (see below), 2006
- Forever... Greatest Hits, by Take That, 2002
- For Ever (album), by Jungle, 2018
- 4Ever (album), by Prince, 2016
- Wu-Tang Forever, by Wu-Tang Clan, 1997
- Forever, by Charly B, or the title song, 2012
- Forever, by Corea, Clarke & White, 2011
- Forever, by Don Diablo, TBA
- Forever!, by Hed PE, 2016
- Forever, by Hillsong Music Australia, 2003
- Forever, by Mad Heads XL, 2008
- Forever, by Pete Drake, or the title song, 1964
- Forever, by Rex Smith, or the title song, 1979
- 4 ever, by Dohzi-T, 2009

=== EPs ===
- Forever... The EP, by Lisa "Left-Eye" Lopes, or the title song (see below), 2009
- Forever, by Memory Garden, 1995
- Forever, by Number One Gun, or the title song, 2002

=== Songs ===
- "Forever" (Aespa song), 2021
- "Forever" (Alekseev song), 2018
- "Forever" (Babymonster song), 2024
- "Forever" (The Beach Boys song), 1970
- "Forever" (Charli XCX song), 2020
- "Forever" (Chris Brown song), 2008
- "Forever" (Ciara song), 2023
- "Forever" (Damage song), 1996
- "Forever" (Dee Dee song), 2001
- "Forever" (Dom Dolla and Kid Cudi song), 2025
- "Forever" (Drake, Kanye West, Lil Wayne, and Eminem song), 2009
- "Forever" (Haim song), 2012
- "Forever" (Justin Bieber song), 2020
- "Forever" (Kenny Loggins song), 1985
- "Forever" (Kid Rock song), 2001
- "Forever" (Kiss song), 1990
- "Forever" (The Little Dippers song), 1960
- "Forever" (Loreen song), 2024
- "Forever" (Luna Sea song), 2026
- "Forever" (Mariah Carey song), 1996
- "Forever" (Martin Garrix and Matisse & Sadko song), 2017
- "Forever" (Medina song), 2012
- "Forever" (Papa Roach song), 2007
- "Forever" (Roy Wood song), 1973
- "Forever" (Sandra song), 2001
- "Forever" (Sevendust song), 2010
- "Forever" (Six60 song), 2012
- "Forever" (The Statler Brothers song), 1986
- "Forever" (Strawbs song), 1970
- "Forever" (Tina Cousins song), 1999
- "Forever" (Wolfgang Gartner and will.i.am song), 2011
- "Forever" (Ykiki Beat song), 2014
- "4Ever" (Lil' Mo song), 2003
- "4ever" (The Veronicas song), 2005
- "Forever", by 4 Strings, 2010
- "Forever", by the Amity Affliction from Everyone Loves You... Once You Leave Them, 2020
- "Forever", by Andy Grammer from Magazines or Novels, 2014
- "Forever", by As I Lay Dying from Frail Words Collapse, 2003
- "Forever", by Brand New Heavies from Brother Sister, 1994
- "Forever", by Breaking Benjamin from Saturate, 2002
- "Forever", by Brooke Valentine, 2012
- "Forever", by the Charlatans from Us and Us Only, 1999
- "Forever", by Chvrches from Love Is Dead, 2018
- "Forever", by Circle II Circle from Delusions of Grandeur, 2008
- "Forever", by Crystal Kay from Vivid, 2012
- "Forever", by the Cure from Faith, 1981 (and 2005 reissue)
- "Forever", by the Dandy Warhols from Why You So Crazy, 2019
- "Forever", by Dannic, 2015
- "Forever", by Destroy Lonely from Love Lasts Forever, 2024
- "Forever", by Dropkick Murphys from Sing Loud, Sing Proud!, 2001
- "Forever", by Edguy from Hellfire Club, 2004
- "Forever", by Eurythmics from Peace, 1999
- "Forever", by Exo from The War, 2017
- "Forever", by Faith Evans from Incomparable, 2014
- "Forever", by Fireflight from Unbreakable, 2008
- "Forever", by Fleetwood Mac from Mystery to Me, 1973
- "Forever", by For the Fallen Dreams from Six, 2018
- "Forever", by Frozen Crown from Crowned in Frost, 2019
- "Forever", by Gesaffelstein from Hyperion, 2019
- "Forever", by Girls' Generation from Oh!, 2010
- "Forever", by Goldfrapp from Black Cherry, 2003
- "Forever", by Greg Sage from Sacrifice (For Love), 1991
- "Forecer", by Hayley Kiyoko from Panorama, 2022
- "Forever", by In This Moment from The Dream, 2008
- "Forever", by Into a Circle, 1987
- "Forever", by James Morrison from The Awakening, 2011
- "Forever", by Jennifer Lopez from Brave, 2007
- "Forever", by Jessica Sutta from I Say Yes, 2017
- "Forever", by John Michael Montgomery from Time Flies, 2008
- "Forever", by Joyner Lucas from 508-507-2209, 2017
- "Forever", by Juliana Hatfield from In Exile Deo, 2004
- "Forever", by Kamelot from Karma, 2001
- "Forever", by Kari Jobe from Majestic, 2014
- "Forever", by Keith Urban from The Speed of Now Part 1, 2020
- "Forever", by Lauv from All 4 Nothing, 2022
- "Forever", by Lewis Capaldi from Divinely Uninspired to a Hellish Extent, 2019
- "Forever", by LFO from LFO, 1999
- "Forever", by Lil Baby from My Turn, 2020
- "Forever", by Lisa "Left-Eye" Lopes from Eye Legacy, 2009
- "Forever", by Live from Live at the Paradiso – Amsterdam, 2008
- "Forever", by Loop from Heaven's End, 1987
- "Forever", by Mario, 2015
- "Forever", by the Marvelettes from Playboy, 1962
- "Forever", by Mercy, 1969
- "Forever", by Michael W. Smith from Glory, 2011
- "Forever", by Michael W. Smith from Worship, 2001
- "Forever", by Moby from Hotel, 2005
- "Forever", by Moby from All Visible Objects, 2020
- "Forever", by Mother Mother from Grief Chapter, 2024
- "Forever", by Mumford & Sons from Delta, 2018
- "Forever", by N-Trance from The Best of N-Trance 1992–2002, 2001
- "Forever", by Nemesea from Uprise, 2016
- "Forever", by Noah Kahan from Stick Season (Forever), 2024
- "Forever", by Orbital from Snivilisation, 1994
- "Forever", by P-Square from The Invasion, 2011
- "Forever", by Primal Fear from Code Red, 2023
- "ForEVER", by Psychic Fever from Exile Tribe from Psychic File I, 2023
- "Forever", by Queen, a B-side from the single "Who Wants to Live Forever", 1986
- "Forever", by Rascal Flatts from Unstoppable, 2009
- "Forever", by Red from Innocence & Instinct, 2009
- "Forever", by Roy Harper from Valentine, 1974
- "Forever", by Sam Cooke, 1957
- "Forever", by Sea Girls from Open Up Your Head, 2020
- "Forever", by Serenity from Words Untold & Dreams Unlived, 2007
- "Forever", by Slushii from Out of Light, 2017
- "Forever", by Snot from Strait Up, 2000
- "Forever", by Stereophonics from Oochya!, 2022
- "Forever", by Stratovarius from Episode, 1996
- "Forever", by Sturm und Drang from Learning to Rock, 2007
- "Forever", by Sugababes, a B-side of the single "New Year", 2000
- "Forever", by Sweet Trip, from You Will Never Know Why, 2009
- "Forever", by Tanita Tikaram from Sentimental, 2005
- "Forever", by Threshold from Extinct Instinct, 1997
- "Forever", by Times of Grace from Songs of Loss and Separation, 2021
- "Forever", by Todrick Hall from Forbidden, 2018
- "Forever", by Tory Lanez, 2019
- "Forever", by Vertical Horizon from Go, 2005
- "Forever", by Vince Neil from Exposed, 1993
- "Forever", by Wayne Horvitz from American Bandstand, 2000
- "Forever", by Will Young from Lexicon, 2019
- "Forever", by Y&T from Black Tiger, 1982
- "Forever", by Yeonjun from No Labels: Part 01, 2025
- "Forever", by ¥$ from Vultures 2, 2024
- "Forever... (Is a Long Time)", by Halsey from Manic, 2020
- "Forever (Keep Me Running)", by Scooter from Age of Love, 1997
- "Forever 2007", by Dropkick Murphys from The Meanest of Times, 2007
- "4eva", by Shygirl, Empress Of and Kingdom from Club Shy, 2024
- "4ever", by Black Eyed Peas from Masters of the Sun Vol. 1, 2018
- "4ever", by Clairo from Diary 001, 2018
- "4ever", by Prince from Lotusflow3r, 2009

== Other uses ==
- Forever Group, a media conglomerate in Myanmar (Burma)
- Forever (Mariah Carey fragrance), a perfume
- Forever (website), a social networking website
- Forever (For Old Lady Sally), a 2006 print by quilter Loretta Pettway Bennett
- Quarry Forever, the name of a slate quarry in Cilgerran, UK

== See also ==
- Forever 21
- Always and Forever (disambiguation)
- Endless (disambiguation)
- Eternity (disambiguation)
- Forever Young (disambiguation)
- Für immer (disambiguation)
- Permanent (disambiguation)
