= Gateway netbooks =

Acer has sold several lines of netbooks under its Gateway brand.

== AMD-based ==
=== LT31 ===
Gateway netbooks
- Operating system: Windows Vista Home Basic
- CPU: 1.2 GHz AMD Athlon 64
- Memory: 2GB RAM, 250GB HDD
- Display: 11.6 in (29 cm)
- Camera: 0.3 megapixel integrated webcam
- Connectivity: 3 USB 2.0 ports
- Power: 6-cell lithium ion
- Dimensions: W×D×H 1.03 in × 11.26 in × 7.99 in (2.6 cm × 28.6 cm × 20.3 cm)
- Weight: 3.04 lb (1.38 kg)
- Website: LT31 support

The LT31 was released in mid-2009. Employing an AMD Athlon L110 processor and having a Radeon X1270 GPU (M690T chipset) powering its 11.6" display (1,366x768), the system was praised by reviewers as a faster and more "grown-up" alternative to a standard netbook (which typically contain slower Intel Atom processors and reduced specifications throughout). On the other hand, it had worse battery life than Atom-based products.

Its US launch price of $399 was judged "a whopping $100 less than the average netbook" by Computer Shopper US, which gave it its "Editor's Choice" award. At the time of the launch, AMD was however unhappy with one its products being used in a netbook, still claiming they had no interest in the netbook market.

=== LT22 ===
Launched in the spring of 2010, the LT22 (together with its very similar brother Acer Aspire One 521) were AMD's entry into the 10-inch netbook field with the Athlon II Neo V105 processor (single core running at 1.2 GHz). Although the Gateway site doesn't list this variant due to it not launching in the US, press reports indicate that the Canadian version of the LT22, launched in August together with the LT32, was powered by the more powerful K125 processor (1.7Ghz) just like its bigger brother.

=== LT32 ===
Launched in mid-2010, the LT32 was a series of "premium netbooks" with 11.6 inch display and powered by an AMD Athlon II Neo K125 processor with an MSRP of $449 in the United States. Engadget described it as "pretty much a rebadge of the Acer Aspire One 721," while a CNET review declared it to be reminiscent of Acer Ferrari One in design.

== Atom-based ==
=== LT10 ===
Launched in early 2009, the LT10 was only stylistically different from the 8.9-inch Acer Aspire One.

=== LT20 ===
Launched in Fall 2009, the LT-20 was a 10.1-in netbook series (1024 x 600 screen resolution) powered by Intel Atom N270 or N280 processors. It was basically a rebadged Acer Aspire One D250. The LT2016u model had 3G capability and was the 2nd netbook (after the HP 1151NR) to be made available with a Verizon Wireless contract with a launch price of $149 with a two-year contract. A PCWorld reviewer described the Verizon offering as "no deal at all" because of its hidden costs.

=== LT21 ===
Launched at CES 2010, the LT21 was described as a "shrunken version" of the LT31 by a PCWorld India reviewer, although its specifications were quite different, being a 10.1-inch device powered by an Atom N450 ("Pine Trail"). It was an unremarkable netbook. Anandtech described the LT21 as identical internally with the simultaneously launched Aspire One 532h, itself a complete redesign.

=== LT23 ===
Previewed at Computex 2010 and officially launched in June, the LT23 was slight improvement over the LT21, featuring an N455 Atom processor with DDR3 support and more styling options for the cover.

=== LT28 ===
The LT28 series was an updated 10.1-inch Atom series launched in mid-2011. It included slightly more powerful processors, up to the N570. Amid a struggling genre by then, it was heavily discounted down to $149.99 on Black Friday 2011.

=== LT40 ===
Launched in February 2012, the LT40 series had a 10.1-inch screen (1024 x 600) and was powered by an Atom N2600 or N2800 "Cedar Trail" processor.
