= Acer Aspire One =

Line of netbooks by Acer Inc.

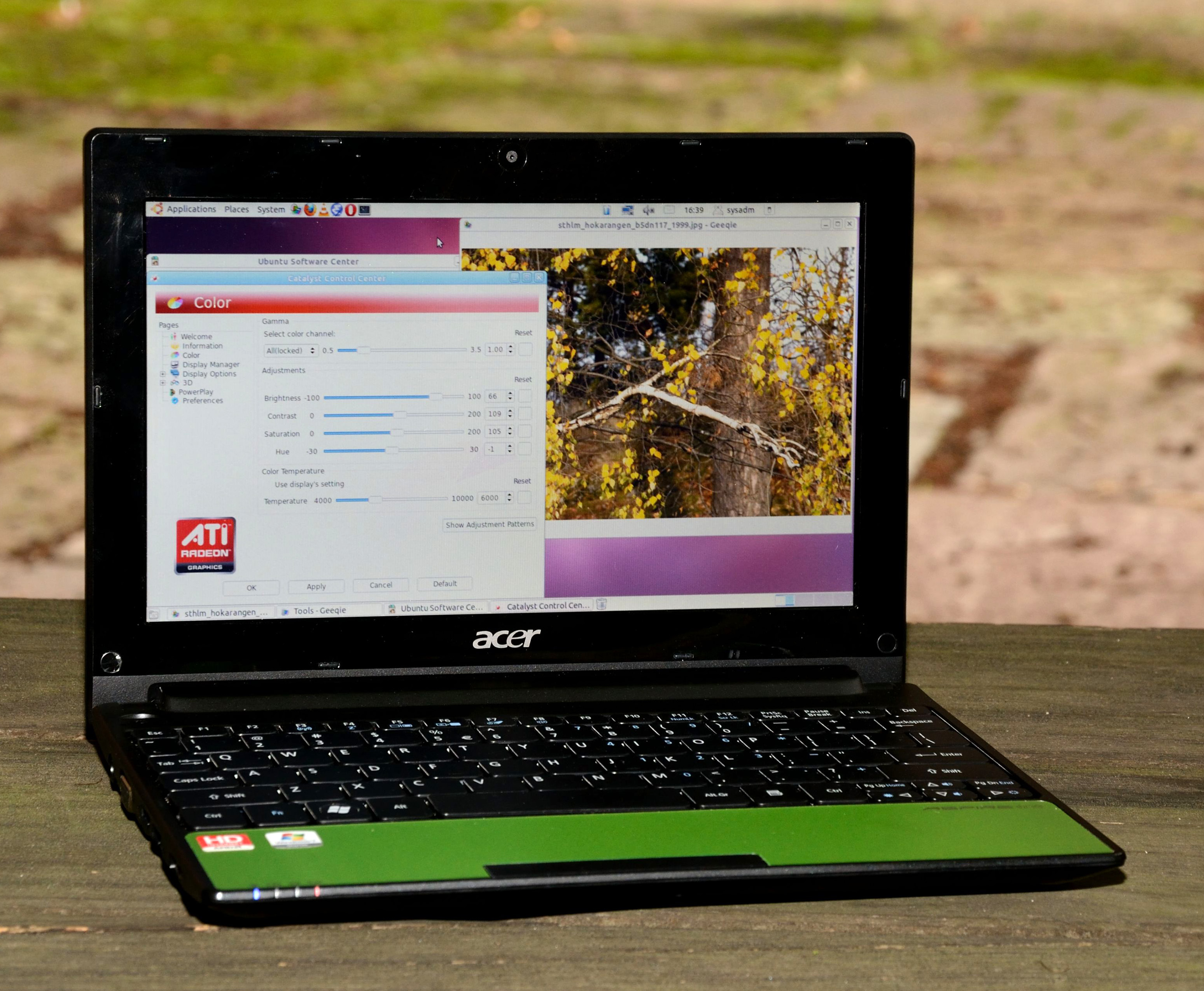
- Acer Aspire One Ultra-Thin 522
- Developer: Acer Inc.
- Type: Subnotebook/Netbook, laptop
- Released: 2008; 18 years ago
- Discontinued: 2013; 13 years ago
- Operating system: Linux, Windows
- CPU: Intel, AMD
- Related: Acer Aspire

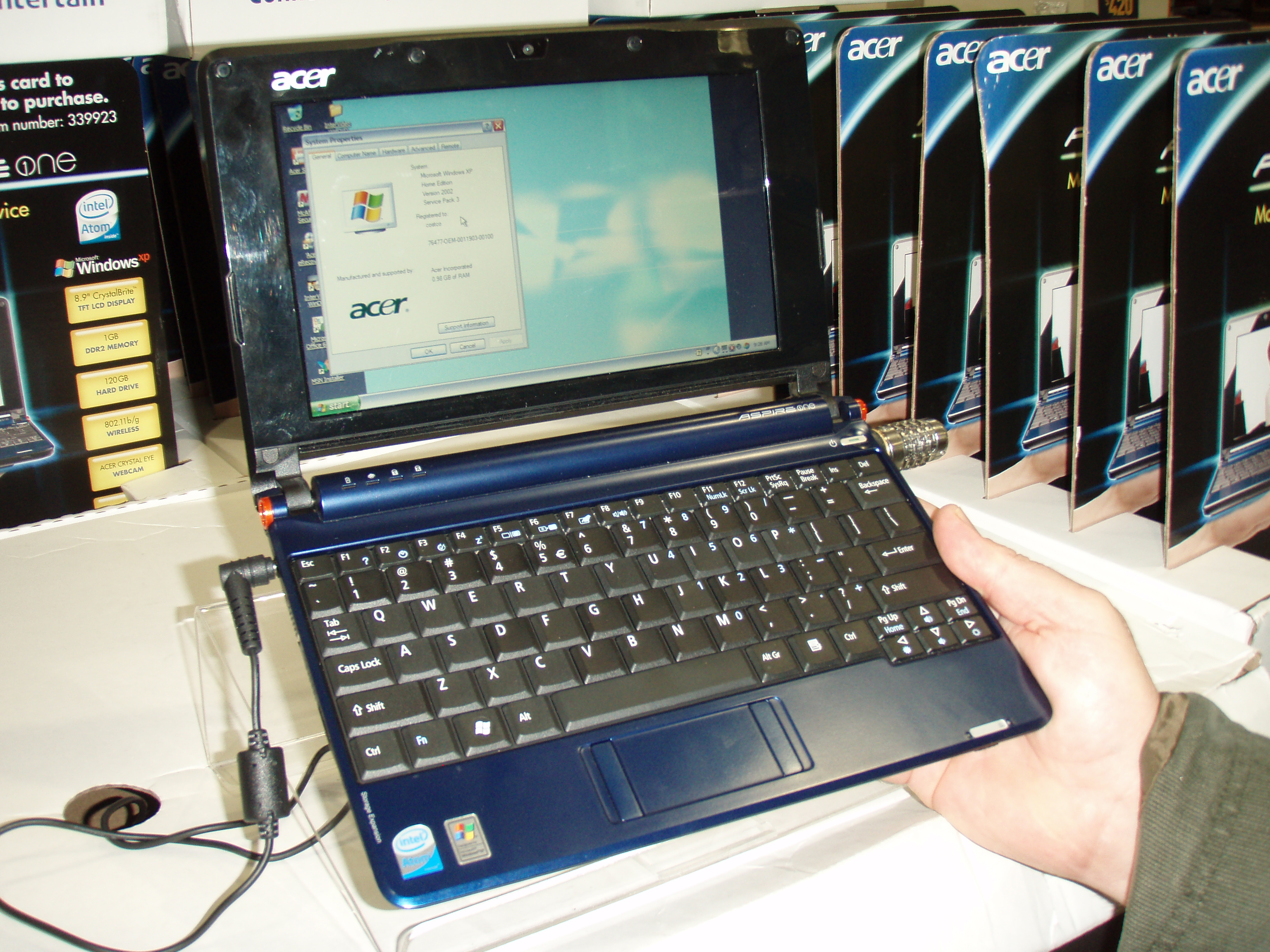
Acer Aspire One ZG5 netbook displayed for sale at a Costco Wholesale store in Marysville, Washington.

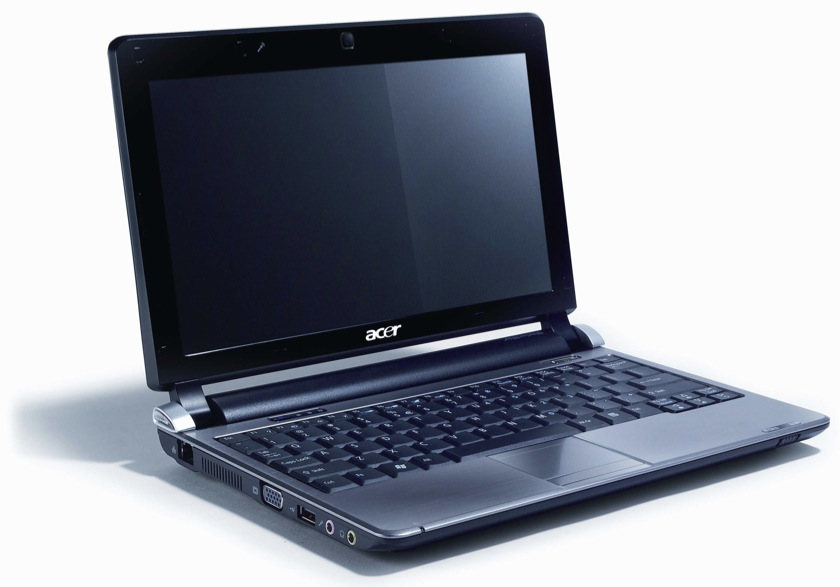
The Ultra-Thin Acer Aspire One D250

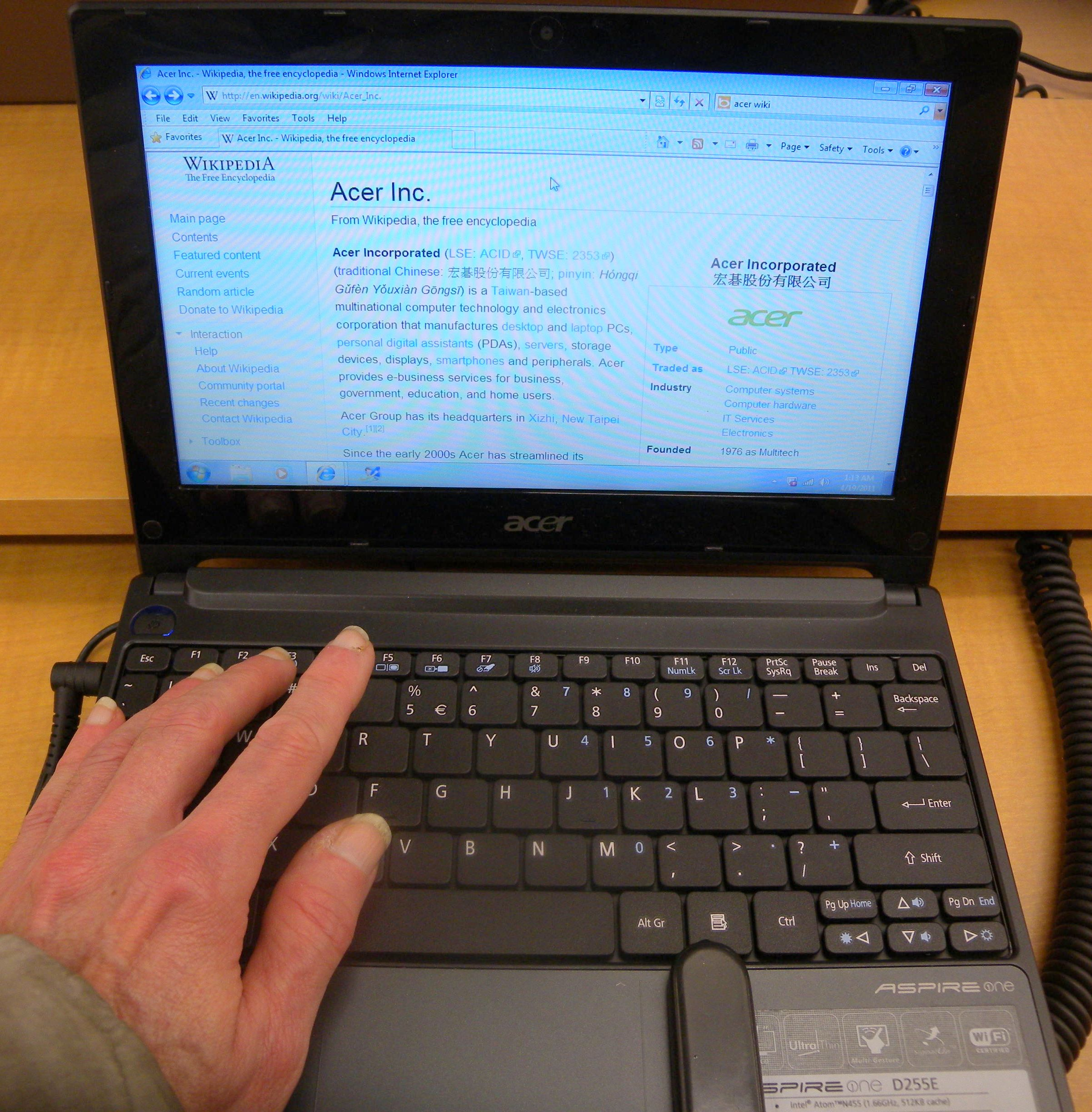
D255E

Acer Aspire One is a line of netbooks and laptops that were produced by Acer Inc. from 2008 to 2013.

Many characteristics of a particular model of Acer Aspire One were dictated by the CPU platform chosen. Initial models were based on Intel Atoms. Later, models with various AMD chips were introduced. Newer versions of the Atom were adopted as well.

Early versions were based on the Intel Atom platform, which consisted of the Intel Atom processor, Intel 945GSE Express chipset and Intel 82801GBM (ICH7M) I/O controller, and was available in several shell colors: seashell white, sapphire blue, golden brown, onyx black, and coral pink.

Higher end models were released in June 2010 consisting of the AMD Athlon II Neo processor and ATI Radeon HD 4225 graphics controller. These were available in onyx black, antique brass, or mesh black shells depending on model. Also released was a version of the Aspire One 521 with an AMD V105 processor running at 1.2 GHz, an ATI Radeon 4225 graphics controller, and equipped with a HDMI port.

A range of later models were powered by AMD Brazos APUs (combined CPU/GPU chips). The AMD chips had more powerful video capabilities but consumed more power.

Its main competitor in the low-cost netbook market was the Asus Eee PC line.

In January 2013, Acer officially ended production of their Aspire One netbook series due to declining sales as a result of consumers favoring tablets and Ultrabooks over netbooks.

== History ==
The line was originally manufactured for Acer Inc. by Quanta Computer; Quanta was phased out as a supplier to Acer, and production of the Acer Aspire One line shifted to other manufacturers in 2009. Also starting in 2009, eSobi Inc. partnered with Acer to preload the eSobi News Center on Acer Aspire One netbooks beginning in the first quarter of 2009.

== Operating systems ==
=== Windows ===
Windows XP Home Edition SP3 was installed on the models with a name ending in X, or ending in B followed by another letter denoting color.

It was also possible to install and run Windows Vista or Windows 7 on the earlier model laptop. In high-end versions appearing during 2009, Windows Vista was pre-installed. The lack of a DVD-ROM drive required creating a bootable USB flash drive (the on-board card reader slots are not bootable) using a USB external DVD drive or PXE boot network install.

Windows 7 Starter was installed by default on models with a name starting in D such as D255E and D257 as well as other later Aspire models.

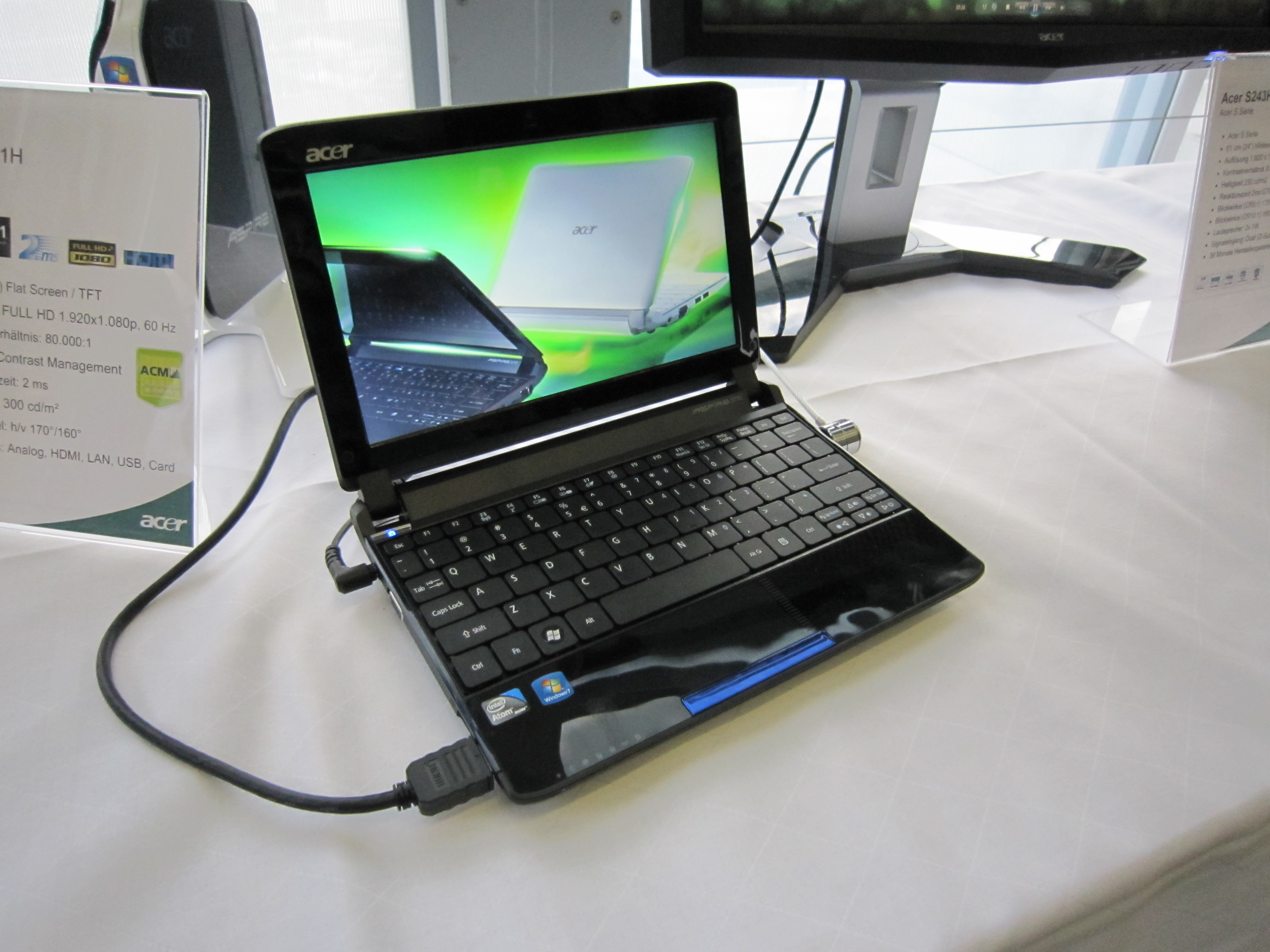
Acer Aspire One 532g featured by Nvidia Ion

=== Linux ===
Models with names starting in L, or ending in A followed by a letter for color, were shipped with Linpus Linux Lite, which was based on Fedora 8. This offered a simplified user interface, with default applications like the Firefox 2 browser, OpenOffice.org 2.3, Acer One Mail and Acer One Messenger available directly on the main screen. The default desktop environment was designed to hide advanced features from the user and to prevent modification. It was possible to modify the system to present a more traditional Xfce 4 desktop, enable more advanced features such as context menus, or install additional software.

It was possible to install and run other Linux distributions on the Acer Aspire One, and some specially customised Linux distributions were designed to offer out-of-the-box functionality. Other Linux-based operating systems could also run.

=== Mac OS X ===
Through the OSx86 project, an Aspire One could boot and run a modified version of Mac OS X, including iAtkos, iDeneb, "XxX" and Kalyway distributions. This procedure was not supported by Apple or Acer.

=== FreeBSD ===
FreeBSD v. 8.2 was known to run on the Acer Aspire One, although some limitations applied: closing the lid did not trigger hibernation, and power management worked to a very limited degree.

=== OpenBSD ===
OpenBSD releases ranging from 4.4 to 6.4 were known to run on some of the many models of Aspire One, with some limitations based on BIOS and other variations.

=== Android ===
Some models were dual boot (e.g. D250, D260), with Android 1.6 and Windows 7 Starter. The computer booted up into Android first, with a tab to select Windows. The Android-x86 OS had limited apps available to it. The Android 1.6 dual boot version was not available in North America.

=== FreeDOS ===
It was possible to install FreeDOS on even the earliest models. Some peripherals, like a USB mouse or Ethernet port, would not be detected by the standard setup and require manual tweaking. There were exceptions - the Aspire One ZG5 would not boot DOS directly. A workaround was to boot DOS from a USB drive first to access a FAT16 partition (must be the first partition) on the hard drive.

== Storage ==
=== Solid state drives ===
The A110 model shipped with an 8 GB or 16 GB solid-state drive (SSD), although some models did not come with one. Early 8 GB models came with the Intel Z-P230, model SSDPAMM0008G1. This SSD was criticized for its slow read and write speed. Intel listed the drive's maximum speeds as 38 MB/s read and 10 MB/s write. Later models came with the slightly faster Samsung P-SSD 1800.

=== Hard disks ===
The hard disk was a regular 2.5-in 5400 rpm SATA drive with 80, 120, 160, 250, 320, 500 or 750 GB. A number of different drives from different manufacturers were reported to be included. Newer-model Aspire Ones took a 7 mm thick drive, as opposed to the usual 9.5 mm thickness that makes up most 2.5-inch form factor hard drives and SSDs.

=== Expansion slot ===
There was an SD/SDHC storage expansion slot on all models for additional storage (the 533 model did not support SDHC as verified by Acer support UK). On Linux versions this automatically expanded the space of the SSD or HDD using aufs. Windows XP models treated it as a normal removable drive.

Some models had a second slot that functions as a standard multi-in-1 flash memory card reader. The 110 BIOS did not allow one to boot an operating system from this slot, but the 150 BIOS was capable of booting from an SDHC card in the slot. (Note: with Linux, it was possible essentially to boot from HD or USB by using a /boot partition on the regular boot device and an initrd that loaded the real OS from the slot).

== Power management ==
The Intel Atom platform had a specified maximum TDP of 11.8 W. Individual figures were 2.5 W for the N270 processor, 6 W for the 945GSE chipset and 3.3 W for the 82801GBM I/O controller. The AUO B089AW01 LCD panel was rated at a maximum power consumption of 3 W. Typical read–write power consumption for the SSD was around 0.3 W, and 0.01 W when idle. The different HDDs were rated at about 1.5–2.5 W for read–write operations and around 0.7 W when idle.

The official ratings for the battery were up to 3 hours for the three cell, and up to 8 hours for the six cell. Linpus Linux Lite was optimized by Acer for lower power consumption. Battery life was shorter on HDD configurations with Windows XP, at approximately 2.5 hours for the three cell. Although the standard three cell battery was 2.2 Ah, some users reported 2.4 Ah and 2.9 Ah batteries from the factory. Various suppliers online carried aftermarket batteries, including the six cell. Aftermarket nine cell batteries were available though they were quite heavy and also protruded out of the back, reducing the aesthetics but improving airflow.

== Specifications ==
| Model | Display | CPU | OS | Storage | | Memory (RAM) | Audio | Battery | Webcam | Bluetooth | Availability |
| Model | Display | CPU | OS | Type | Size | Memory (RAM) | Audio | Battery | Webcam | Bluetooth | Availability |
|---|---|---|---|---|---|---|---|---|---|---|---|
| A110L | 8.9 in, 1024×600 TFT LCD | Intel Atom N270 | Linux | SSD | 8 GB | 512 MB | Intel High Definition Audio | 3 cell 24 Wh | 0.3 megapixel | No | US, CA, GB, AU, UAE, EU, PT |
| A110X | 8.9 in, 1024×600 TFT LCD | Intel Atom N270 | Windows XP | SSD | 16 GB | 1 GB | | 3 cell 24 Wh | 0.3 megapixel | No | US, CA, GB, AU, UAE, INDIA |
| A150L | 8.9 in, 1024×600 TFT LCD | Intel Atom N270 | Linux | HDD | 120 GB | 1 GB | | 3 cell 24 Wh | 1.3 megapixel | No | CA, GB, INDIA |
| A150L-3G | 8.9 in, 1024×600 TFT LCD | Intel Atom N270 | Linux | HDD | 160 GB | 1 GB | | 3 cell 24 Wh | 1.3 megapixel | No | US, INDIA |
| A150X | 8.9 in, 1024×600 TFT LCD | Intel Atom N270 | Windows XP | HDD | 120 GB | 1 GB | | 3 cell 24 Wh | 0.3 megapixel | No | US, CA, GB, AE, TW, AU, INDIA |
| A150X | 8.9 in, 1024×600 TFT LCD | Intel Atom N270 | Windows XP | HDD | 160 GB | 1 GB | | 6 cell 57 Wh | 1.3 megapixel | No | US, CA, CH, TW, INDIA |
| A150X-3G | 8.9 in, 1024×600 TFT LCD | Intel Atom N270 | Windows XP | HDD | 120 GB | 1 GB | | 6 cell 57 Wh | 1.3 megapixel | No | GB, MX, DE (T-Mobile), INDIA |
| ZG5 | 8.9 in, 1024×600 TFT LCD | Intel Atom N270 | Windows XP | HDD | 120 GB | 512 MB | | 3 cell 24 Wh/ 6 cell 57 Wh | 0.3/1.3 megapixel | No | BR CA, GB, INDIA |
| ZG5 | 8.9 in, 1024×600 TFT LCD | Intel Atom N270 | Windows XP | HDD | 160 GB | 512 MB | | 3 cell 24 Wh/ 6 cell 57 Wh | 0.3/1.3 megapixel | No | US (Walmart, RadioShack), SI (SiOL) |
| ZG5 | 8.9 in, 1024×600 TFT LCD | Intel Atom N270 | Linux | HDD | 160 GB | 512 MB | | 3 cell 24 Wh/ 6 cell 57 Wh | 0.3/1.3 megapixel | No | GB, TW, BR |
| ZG5 | 8.9 in, 1024×600 TFT LCD | Intel Atom N270 | Linux | SSD | 8 GB | 512 MB | | 3 cell 24 Wh/ 6 cell 57 Wh | 0.3/1.3 megapixel | No | DK, TW, GR, PT, AT, INDIA |
| ZG5 | 8.9 in, 1024×600 TFT LCD | Intel Atom N270 | Linux | SSD | 16 GB | 512 MB | | 3 cell 24 Wh/ 6 cell 57 Wh | 0.3/1.3 megapixel | No | GB, others? |
| ZG5 | 8.9 in, 1024×600 TFT LCD | Intel Atom N270 | Windows XP | SSD | 8 GB | 512 MB | | 3 cell 24 Wh/ 6 cell 57 Wh | 0.3/1.3 megapixel | No | US, INDIA |
| D150 | 10.1 in, 1024×600 TFT LCD | Intel Atom N270 | Windows XP | HDD | 160 GB | 1 GB, can accept up to 2 GB (D250 can accept 4 GB) | | 3 cell 24 Wh/ 6 cell 48/58 Wh | 0.3 megapixel | Yes | AU, CA, GB, IN, NL, SG, TH, US, UAE |
| D250 | 10.1 in, 1024×600 TFT LCD | Intel Atom N270 or N280 | Windows XP/Windows 7 Starter/Linux, some with Android 1.6 | HDD | 250 GB | 1 GB, can accept up to 2 GB (D250 can accept 4 GB) | | 3 cell 24 Wh/ 6 cell 48 Wh | 0.3 megapixel | Yes | AU, CA, GB, IN, ID, NL, SG, UAE, US |
| D255 | 10.1 in, 1024×600 TFT LCD | Intel Atom N450 or N550 | Windows XP/Windows 7 Starter/Linux, some with Android 1.6 | HDD | 250 GB | 1 GB, can accept up to 2 GB (D250 can accept 4 GB) | | 3 cell 24 Wh/ 6 cell 48 Wh | 1.3 megapixel | Yes | AU, CA, GB, IN, ID, NL, SG, UAE, US |
| D257 | 10.1 in, 1024×600 TFT LCD | Intel Atom N455, N550, N570 | Windows XP/Windows 7 Starter/Linux, some with Android 1.6 | HDD | 250/320/500 GB | 1 GB, can accept up to 2 GB (D250 can accept 4 GB) | | 3 cell 24 Wh/ 6 cell 48 Wh | 1.3 megapixel | Yes | DK FR |
| D260 | 10.1 in, 1024×600 TFT LCD | Intel Atom N450, N455, N475 | Windows 7 Starter, some with Android 1.6 | HDD | 250 GB | 1 GB, can accept up to 2 GB (D250 can accept 4 GB) | | 3 cell 24 Wh/ 6 cell 48 Wh | 0.3 megapixel | Yes | AU, PH, UAE, RO |
| D270 | 10.1 in, 1024×600 TFT LCD | Intel Atom N2600, N2800 | Windows 7 Starter | HDD | 250/320/500 GB | 1/2 GB, can accept up to 2 GB | | 3 cell 24 Wh/ 6 cell 48 Wh | 0.3 megapixel | Yes | ID, others? |
| 521 | 10.1 in, 1024×600 TFT LCD | AMD Neo K125 or AMD V105 | Windows 7 Starter | HDD | 250 GB | 1 GB | | 6 cell 48/63 Wh | 1.3 megapixel | Yes | US |
| 522 | 10.1 in 1280×720 TFT LCD | AMD C-50, C-60 | Windows 7 Starter | HDD | 250 GB | 1 GB, can accept up to 4 GB, Windows 7 Starter Starter will only use up to 2 GB | | 3 cell 24 Wh/ 6 cell 48 Wh | 1.3 megapixel | Yes | US, CA, EU, TH |
| 522 | 10.1 in 1280×720 TFT LCD | AMD C-50, C-60 | Linpus Linux | HDD | 320 GB | 2 GB, can accept up to 4 GB | | 3 cell 24 Wh/ 6 cell 48 Wh | 0.3 megapixel | Yes | TH |
| 531h | 10.1 in, 1024×600 TFT LCD | Intel Atom N270, N280 | Windows XP | HDD | 160 GB | 1 GB, can accept up to 2 GB | | 6 cell 48/58 Wh | 1.3 megapixel | Yes | RU, others? |
| P531h | 10.1 in, 1024×600 TFT LCD | Intel Atom N270, N280 | Windows XP | HDD | 160 GB | 1 GB | | 6 cell 48/58 Wh | 0.3 megapixel | Yes | US, CA, GB, AU, UAE, IN, SG, NL |
| 532h | 10.1 in, 1024×600 TFT LCD | Intel Atom N450 | Windows 7 Starter | HDD | 160/250 GB | 1 GB, can accept up to 2 GB | | 3 cell 24 Wh / 6 cell 48 Wh | 0.3 megapixel | Yes | US, CA, GB, AU, UAE, EU, PT |
| 721 | 11.6 in 1366×768 TFT LCD | AMD Neo K125 | Windows 7 Home Premium | HDD | 250 GB | 2 GB, can accept up to 12 GB | | 6 cell 48/63 Wh | 0.3/1.3 megapixel | Yes | US |
| 722 | 11.6 in 1366×768 TFT LCD | AMD C-50, C-60 | Windows 7 Home Premium | HDD | 250/320/500 GB | 1 GB, can accept up to 8 GB | | 6 cell 48 Wh | 0.3/1.3 megapixel | Yes | US, CA, EU, Asia |
| 751h (AKA ZA3) | 11.6 in 1366×768 TFT LCD | Intel Atom Z520 | Windows XP/Vista/Windows 7 Home Premium | HDD | 160/250/500/750 GB | 1/2 GB, can accept up to 2 GB | | 3 cell 24 Wh/ 6 cell 58 Wh | 0.3/1.3 megapixel | Yes | US, CA, EU, AU, TH |
| 752 | 11.6 in 1366×768 TFT LCD | Intel Celeron M 743 | Windows 7 Home Premium | HDD | 320 GB | 2 GB, can accept up to 4 GB | | 3 cell 24 Wh/ 6 cell 48/62 Wh | 0.3 megapixel | Yes | NO |
| 753 | 11.6 in 1366×768 TFT LCD | Intel Celeron M U3400 | Windows 7 Home Premium | HDD | 250 GB | 2 GB, can accept up to 4 GB | | 6 cell 48 Wh | 1.3 megapixel | Yes | DA, possibly EU |
| 756 | 11.6 in 1366×768 TFT LCD | Intel Celeron 877 or Pentium B987 | Windows 7/Linpus Linux/Windows 8 | HDD | 320/500 GB | 2/4 GB, can accept up to 16 GB | | 4 cell 37 Wh | 1.3 megapixel | Yes | EU? |

An Acer AOD model (10.1" screen) product comparison guide, in the form of a spreadsheet file download, was available from increa.com.

== Additional hardware ==
From November 2008 the 3G-enabled model Aspire One A150X-3G was available in Europe, while models with 3G modems began shipping in the United Kingdom in December of the same year and were denoted by the letter G in their model number. The first generation Aspire One webcam was an Acer Labs International M5608 camera controller with attached 0.3 MP SuYin or 1.3 MP LiteOn CMOS sensor.

Some models of the Aspire One used an Intel 945GSE chipset which only supported 2 GB of RAM. Installing memory modules larger than 2 GB has caused the Aspire to fail the power-on self-test. Model 522, featuring the AMD Fusion C-50 chip, was reported to work with 4 GB installed (although the included Windows 7 Starter edition had an artificially imposed 2 GB limit).

== AO751h (751h) (ZA3) ==
The AO751h had the larger 11.6" screen with an LED backlit display and a 1366x768 native resolution. It included a 1GB/667MHz DDR2 533 MHz SDRAM memory option (2 GB being the maximum), a 160 GB HDD option, Bluetooth option, Intel northbridge US15W, and an OS option for Windows Vista Home Basic edition or Windows XP Home Edition. All AO751h units were powered by an Intel Atom Z520 processor running at 1330 MHz (or 1240 MHz in first version). The US15W system controller incorporated a GMA500 video core. The AO751h had a dual power (AC/DC) option. The six cell battery provided a working time of about 8 hours. Besides the mentioned specifications of the AO751h it supported 10/100 Mbit/s Ethernet interface, 802.11g Wi-Fi card Atheros, Bluetooth 2.1, standard VGA-out jack, 3 USB 2.0 ports, a Memory Card reader 5:1 (xD-Picture Card, SD card), as well as Microphone In jack 3.5 mm (1/8" Mini), Headphone Out jack 3.5 mm (1/8" Mini). One of the cons was the relatively small TouchPad and mouse buttons. Large and comfortable keyboard is one of the distinguishing features of the device.

There were reports of some AO751h units randomly freezing, which led to recalls in Denmark. Some users reported that having their motherboards replaced by Acer solved the problem, and Acer officially reported that the fix is to install an updated BIOS.

=== AOA150 speaker vibration and other issues ===
The 8.9" models had an improperly designed speaker location that caused vibration to the internal hard drive, causing it to be problematic. The right speaker was especially prone to this. Audio frequencies around 1 kHz caused the hard drive to almost stop responding. Full volume MP3/audio playback easily caused these models to run extremely slowly, or crash because of unresponsive disk I/O. This problem also caused bad sectors, crashed hard drives and corrupted Windows partitions in the long term. Even sound from an external speaker with 1 kHz tone test caused this hard drive behaviour. SSD drives did not suffer from this problem. Workarounds identified were: listening to music at a lower volume, using only the left speaker, using the Realtek HD Audio Manager's equalizer to tone down the 1 kHz frequency, replacing the hard drive with an SSD, and trying to install soft sound dampening material around the speakers and the hard drive.

== Aspire One Happy ==
The Acer Aspire One Happy was a 10.1 inch netbook with different operating systems: (Android 2.1 and Windows 7 with only Windows 7 in North America). It was launched by Acer Inc. in November 2010. The computer was nearly identical to the Acer Aspire One D255. The main difference was that the Happy case came in several different color options: candy pink, lavender purple, lime green and Hawaii blue). It was powered by Intel Atom N450 or dual-core Intel Atom N550, with up to 2 GB RAM and Intel Graphics Media Accelerator 3150. There was also a 3G version for proper portability, with each model measuring 24 mm thick and weighing 1.25 kg with a six-cell battery pack.

In mid-2011 the "Acer Aspire One Happy 2" line was released. This model may have had Bluetooth on board. It seemed that some countries shipped this newer model with Bluetooth while others did not. This seemed to depend which wireless card they shipped with, some could in fact be replaced as the BIOS should not be card specific. The functionality uses an internal USB bus on miniPCIe slot specification but not all have these pins connected. A good way to check was find a miniPCIe to USB3 card and see if the device was recognized or not. The Acer Aspire One Happy 2 appeared to have not been sold in North America.

== Reception ==
CNET editors' review was positive, although held reservations as the Aspire One was early to market.

A The Tech Report (Techreport.com) review of the 751h and the similar Gateway LT3103U, was generally positive, praising the notebooks' battery life but criticizing the large number of third-party software products preinstalled and running by default on the computers.

However, by the mid 2010s various tech reviewers criticized them for aging very poorly and being inadequate for modern web browsing or even early 2000s gaming due to the single core Atom CPU and the integrated GMA 3150 graphics. When it came to gaming performance the Acer Aspire One seemed to perform on par with a Pentium 3 1.4 GHz PC equipped with a Voodoo 3 3000 but with DX9 features.

== See also ==
- Gateway netbooks
- Comparison of netbooks
