= Relationship between Google and Wikipedia =

Presentation of different projects between Google and Wikimedia during WikiArabia 2019 conference in Marrakesh (in Arabic)

The relationship between Google and Wikipedia was collaborative in Wikipedia's early days, when Google helped reduce the pagerank of widespread, uneditable Wikipedia clones that were effectively ad farms. In 2007, Google introduced Knol, a direct competitor for community-driven encyclopedia creation, which was subsequently shut down in 2012. Google later supported Wikimedia with numerous grants, and came to rely on Wikipedia for addressing the problem of misinformation on YouTube, providing verifiable and well-sourced information to those seeking it. Google and Wikimedia Enterprise started a partnership in 2021.

== History ==
In 2007, Google introduced Knol, an encyclopedia with user-generated content. The New York Times compared Wikipedia to Knol at the time, and it was largely seen as a direct competitor. Knol was largely seen as a failure, and the project was closed and subsequently deleted in 2012.

In 2008, various news sources reported that most of Wikipedia's traffic came from referrals from Google search.

In February 2010, Google gave US$2,000,000 as its first grant to the Wikimedia Foundation. Google founder Sergey Brin commented that "Wikipedia is one of the greatest triumphs of the internet".

Google Knowledge Graph showing information on Thomas Jefferson sourced from Wikipedia

In May 2012, Google launched a project known as the Google Knowledge Graph, which produced instant answer panels alongside traditional search engine results. Later, results from querying the knowledge graph complemented string-based search in producing the ranked list of search results as well. A large amount of the information presented in the knowledge panel infoboxes is retrieved from Wikipedia and the CIA World Factbook.

In January 2019, Google donated $3 million to the Wikimedia Foundation.

In June 2022, Google and the Internet Archive were announced as Wikimedia Enterprise's first customers, though of the two, only Google will be paying for the service.

== Combating misinformation ==
In March 2018, YouTube announced that they would be using information from Wikipedia to address the problem of misinformation on the website. On videos about certain topics such as the September 11 attacks, the Apollo program, the 2020 United States presidential election, and the COVID-19 pandemic, information panels are included below the video. These panels are intended to combat misinformation. They contain information sourced directly from Wikipedia, along with other websites such as Encyclopædia Britannica, The World Factbook, the Associated Press, and the Centers for Disease Control and Prevention.

== Links ==
- :meta:Overview of Wikimedia Foundation and Google Partnership, a Wikimedia Foundation statement
