= Endlessly =

Endlessly may refer to:

== Albums ==
- Endlessly (Duffy album) or the title song, 2010
- Endlessly (Dizzy Gillespie album), 1988
- Endlessly, or the title song (see below), by Brook Benton, 1959
- Endlessly, or the title song, by Lin Yu-chun, 2011

== Songs ==
- "Endlessly" (song), by Brook Benton, 1959; covered by Sonny James (1970)
- "Endlessly", by Anna Timofei competing to represent Moldova in the Eurovision Song Contest 2018
- "Endlessly", by b4-4 from b4-4, 2000
- "Endlessly", by Baboon from We Sing and Play, 1999
- "Endlessly", by The Cab from Symphony Soldier, 2011
- "Endlessly", by Dino from The Way I Am, 1993
- "Endlessly", by Green River Ordinance from Fifteen, 2016
- "Endlessly", by Joe Lynn Turner from Rescue You, 1985
- "Endlessly", by John Foxx from The Golden Section, 1983
- "Endlessly", by Ludwig Galea
- "Endlessly", by Muse from Absolution, 2003
- "Endlessly", by Neil Sedaka, a B-side of the single "Laughter in the Rain", 1974
- "Endlessly", by Nothing from Guilty of Everything, 2014
- "Endlessly", by Sennek, 2019
- "Endlessly", composed by Walter Kent, 1945

== See also ==
- Endless (disambiguation)
