= David L. Tennenhouse =

Canadian-American computer researcher and technology executive

- Education: University of Cambridge
- Scientific career
- Fields: Computer science
- Workplaces: Massachusetts Institute of Technology
- Thesis: (1989)
- Doctoral advisor: Roger Needham

David Lawrence Tennenhouse (born c. 1957) is a Canadian–American computer researcher and technology executive.

== Life ==
Tennenhouse was born about 1957 in Ottawa, Canada. He received a bachelor's and master's degree in electrical engineering from the University of Toronto. In 1989 he completed a PhD at the University of Cambridge under advisor Roger Needham. His dissertation was Site interconnection and the exchange architecture. He then joined the faculty of Massachusetts Institute of Technology (MIT). He was chairman of the Technology and Policy Working Group of the US National Information Infrastructure Task Force at some time point. In 1996 he became director of the Information Technology Office of the Defense Advanced Research Projects Agency (DARPA), overseeing US government research.

In 1999, he joined Intel as a director of research. In 2001, he founded what were sometimes called the Intel Research Lablets. One of the projects sponsored was TinyOS. In February 2006 he became the chief executive officer of A9.com, the search subsidiary of Amazon.com, replacing Udi Manber. He left Amazon in September 2006. In 2007 he became a partner at the venture capital firm New Venture Partners.

In 2004, he was granted IEEE fellowship for leadership in the development of active networks.

In September 2012 he became vice president for technology policy at Microsoft. In May 2014 he joined VMware to direct its research.
