= Eternal =

Eternal(s) or The Eternal may refer to:

- Eternity, an infinite amount of time, or a timeless state
- Immortality or eternal life
- God, the supreme being, creator deity, and principal object of faith in monotheism

== Comics, film and television ==
- Eternals (comics), a fictional race of superhumans in the Marvel Comics universe
  - Eternals (film), a 2021 film based on the comics characters
- Eternal (film), a 2004 horror film
- The Eternal (film) or Trance, a 1998 horror film
- Eternal (Doctor Who), a fictional race of cosmic beings from the TV series Doctor Who
- Eternal Pictures, an international film distribution company
- "Eternal", an episode of the TV series Eleventh Hour
- Eternal, a fictional warship captained by Andrew Waltfeld in the Gundam anime universe

== Music ==
=== Musical groups ===
- Eternal (group), a British girl group
- The Eternal (band), an Australian rock band
- Eternal, a British doom metal band featuring Electric Wizard member Jus Oborn
- Eternal, a British shoegaze band featuring future Slowdive member Christian Savill
- Vision Eternel, a Canadian-American ambient rock band

=== Albums ===
- Eternal (Branford Marsalis album) or the title song, 2004
- Eternal (Eternal album), 1999
- Eternal (Isley Brothers album) or the title song, 2001
- Eternal (Jamie O'Neal album), 2014
- Eternal (Klaus Schulze album), 2017
- Eternal (Malevolent Creation album) or the title song, 1995
- Eternal (Samael album), 1999
- Eternal (Stratovarius album), 2015
- Eternal (War of Ages album) or the title song, 2010
- The Eternal (album), by Sonic Youth, 2009
- Eternals (album) or the title song, by Seventh Avenue, 2004
- Eternal: Live, by Joy Division, 2026

=== EPs ===
- Eternal (Taemin EP), 2024
- Eternal (Young K EP), 2021

=== Songs ===
- "Eternal" (Jin Akanishi song), 2011
- "Eternal", by Bone Thugs-n-Harmony from E. 1999 Eternal
- "Eternal", by Bruce Dickinson from Tyranny of Souls
- "Eternal", by Chance the Rapper from The Big Day
- "Eternal", by David Banner from MTA2: Baptized in Dirty Water
- "Eternal", by Depeche Mode from Spirit
- "Eternal", by Evanescence from Origin
- "Eternal", by Front Line Assembly from Total Terror
- "Eternal", by Gothminister from Utopia
- "Eternal", by Holly Herndon from Proto
- "Eternal", by Into Eternity from The Scattering of Ashes
- "Eternal", by Johnny Hates Jazz from Magnetized
- "Eternal", by Mushroomhead from XIII
- "Eternal", by P.O.D. from Payable on Death
- "Eternal", by Shadows Fall from Somber Eyes to the Sky
- "Eternal", by William Joseph from Within
- "Eternal", by Wumpscut from Blutkind
- "The Eternal", by Bury Tomorrow from Earthbound
- "The Eternal", by Joy Division from Closer

=== Companies ===
- Eternal Records, American record label
- Eternal (record label), Taiwanese record label

== Video games ==
- Eternal (video game), collectible card video game
- Vegas Eternal, an esports team in the Overwatch League

== See also ==
- Eternalism (disambiguation)
- Eternity (disambiguation)
- Permanent (disambiguation)
- Transcendence (disambiguation)
