= Niche (company) =

American ranking and review website

- Formerly: College Prowler, Inc.
- Type: Private
- Founded: August 9, 2002
- Headquarters: Pittsburgh, Pennsylvania, United States
- Key people: Luke Skurman, Founder and CEO
- Number of employees: 325
- Website: www.niche.com

Niche.com, formerly known as College Prowler, is an American company headquartered in Pittsburgh, Pennsylvania, that runs a ranking and review site. The company was founded by Luke Skurman in 2002 as a publisher of print guidebooks on U.S. colleges, but is now an online resource providing information on K–12 schools, colleges, cities, neighborhoods, and companies across the United States.

== History ==
Niche, Inc. was founded as College Prowler in August 2002 by Luke Skurman and Joey Rahimi. Then students at Carnegie Mellon University's Tepper School of Business, they spun the company out of a project in their entrepreneurship class.

In 2004, the small company obtained an investment of $500,000 from Glen Meakem, who then became chairman. In 2005, College Prowler was recognized by Fast Company for being one of the 50 fastest-growing companies in the nation. Originally, the company produced print guidebooks, but by 2007 their content was made available online for a subscription fee, and then by 2009 the subscription was removed making all web content free.

In 2013, College Prowler changed its name to Niche and started to cover K-12 school districts using federal data, state data, and user-generated reviews. Within months of launching the K-12 product, Niche had collected 500,000 user reviews on half of all high schools in the US. After transitioning to the new business model, the bulk of revenue then came from partners who helped schools market and advertised to potential students.

In 2018, Niche raised a $6.6 million Series B funding round led by Allen & Company and Grit Capital Partners. The company also added Paul Palmieri, General Partner of Grit Capital Partners, to its board of directors.

In 2020, Niche raised a $35 million Series C round of funding led by Radian Capital, with Radian Capital partner and co-founder Weston Gaddy, and Francisco D’Souza, executive vice chairman and co-founder of Cognizant, both joining the board of directors. At the time of funding, Niche offered over 130,000 in-depth profiles on schools and colleges with over 140 million reviews and ratings from students, parents and alumni.

In 2025, Niche acquired Toronto-based company GoodKind, a communication platform where potential students can connect with academic institutions. This was the first acquisition in company history.

== Product ==
Niche, as College Prowler, provided rankings, report cards (with attributed grades) and reviews of colleges in the US. During its rebranding process, Niche expanded its coverage to include K-12 schools as well as neighborhoods under their "places to live" category. In addition to its profiles, Niche also lists scholarships from the company and third parties. Niche functions as a two-sided platform with free access for prospective students and over 15,000 school clients who pay for services to help them market to these users, including placing advertising and promotional material on the site. Niche also offers access to its data for a cost to other parties such as real estate companies, which has raised concerns that this linkage might reinforce neighborhood disparities based on ethnicity and income.

== Controversies ==
In 2008, the company created hundreds of "Class of 2013" Facebook groups, typically created by actual students or colleges themselves, for the purpose of promoting College Prowler. The situation was referred to as "Facebookgate". According to the CEO, "The original purpose was to use these groups as a way to inform students that they can access a free guide about their new college on our site." College Prowler later removed all administrative access from the 125 groups, admitting, "It was clearly over the line."
