= A9.com =

Subsidiary of Amazon based in Palo Alto, California

A9.com, Inc.
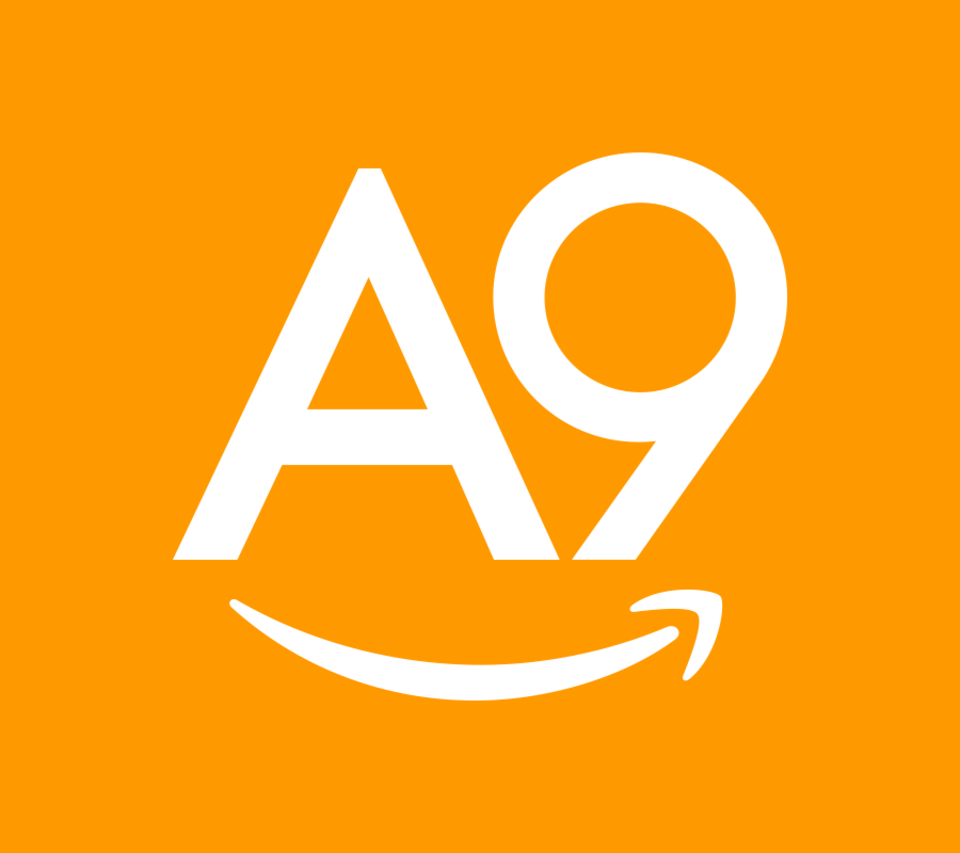

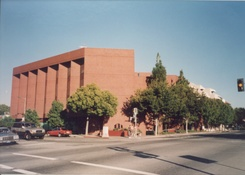
- A9.com office in Palo Alto, CA
- Type: Search Engine
- Industry: Communications
- Founded: 2004
- Founder: Udi Manber
- Headquarters: Palo Alto, California
- Parent: Amazon

A9.com was a subsidiary of Amazon that developed search engine and search advertising technology. A9 was based in Palo Alto, California, with teams in Seattle, Bangalore, Beijing, Dublin, Iași, Munich and Tokyo. A9 had development efforts in areas of product search, cloud search, visual search, augmented reality, advertising technology and community question answering.

== History ==
A9, a subsidiary of Amazon.com, was founded in 2003 with an exclusive focus on producing technology for search and advertising. Initially located in the Wells Fargo building on Hamilton Avenue, in 2004 they moved into the building previously used by the DEC Systems Research Center in Palo Alto, California. One purpose of A9.com was to leverage algorithms, and the name was chosen as a numeronym to represent that word (i.e. 'A' + 9 other letters). The office was in Silicon Valley, near Stanford University. Under the direction of its first president, Udi Manber, A9 focused on several areas, including the A9.com destination website, a browser toolbar, product search, and a search advertising platform. Some early A9 services such as "search inside the book" continued, while others have been discontinued. The A9 search engine powered product search for Amazon.com and several other eCommerce retailers.

In February 2006, Manber resigned to move to Google and was replaced by David L. Tennenhouse as president. In September 2006, William Stasior, one of A9's founders and a former AltaVista and Amazon.com executive, was named president. In June 2009, A9 acquired SnapTell, which developed smartphone-based visual search applications.

Stasior left in October 2012 to join Apple Inc. to work on Siri. Brian Pinkerton, who had developed WebCrawler in the 1990s, became general manager of A9 in 2012.

Brian Pinkerton was replace by Srikanth Thirumalai, who left when A9 became Amazon Search.

In 2019, after reporting from The Wall Street Journal revealed that Amazon had changed its search algorithm to favor more profitable products, Amazon took down the A9.com site and pointed the domain name to Amazon's home page.

== Projects ==
=== A9.com search portal ===
A9.com originally operated a search portal, along with an A9 toolbar, which was first demonstrated on April 14, 2004. The service featured some innovative design elements, allowing users to choose from over 400 sources to search and view results in separate columns grouped by source. In addition to web search results, users could get product search results from Amazon, encyclopedia results from Wikipedia, movie information from IMDb, and others, starting in September 2004. Web search results were provided by different search engines over time. The search portal functionality was discontinued in 2008.

=== OpenSearch ===
A9 developed a protocol called OpenSearch that enabled the "plug-in" search source functionality from the A9.com portal. The original specification, OpenSearch 1.0, was released in March 2005. A9 made the protocol freely available through a Creative Commons license.

=== BlockView ===
A9 developed the first service that allowed users of maps and "yellow pages" (a telephone directory) to view buildings at street level. Called BlockView, the service was announced in January 2005. Within a year, the service included images for 24 US cities. Both BlockView and maps (as well as support for the A9 tool bar) were discontinued in September 2006.

=== Clickriver ===
In November 2006, A9 announced Clickriver, an advertising program that let third parties place advertisements on Amazon.com pages. Clickriver focused primarily on products and services that complemented Amazon's own offerings. For example, if a customer viewed a television on Amazon, a Clickriver ad might offer installation services in his or her local area. Clickriver was discontinued in 2010, replaced by other Amazon advertising programs.

=== Community question answering ===
A9 operated Askville, a community-based question-and-answer site first tested in December 2006. Service began in November 2007. Compared with other question-and-answer sites, Askville focused more on social interaction, allowing users to follow other users as well as track specific topics. On October 25, 2013, Askville was shut down.

=== CloudSearch ===
CloudSearch is a managed Amazon Web Services service that makes client data searchable. For example, a business that wanted to allow customers to search their catalog could upload the catalog entries to CloudSearch and then route search requests from their application or web site to the service. CloudSearch instances could be brought online as data or traffic volume demanded. Sites using CloudSearch included SmugMug, and Sage Bionetworks.

In March 2014, Amazon moved away from using A9 for CloudSearch to technology based on Apache Solr.

=== Product search ===
A9 continued to develop and operate the service that provides search on all nine Amazon.com sites, as well as other retail sites owned by Amazon such as Endless.com, Javari.de, and Audible.com. In addition, A9 search is also used by other retailers, such as Marks & Spencer, that license the Amazon retail platform for their online presence.

A9 provided the "search inside the book" capability for Amazon. Announced in 2003, this service allows customers to search through the full text of hundreds of thousands of books. This feature is available both for searching individual books and for the entire book catalog.

=== Visual Search ===
The visual search group at A9 created mobile applications that recognize objects and allow users to find these products on Amazon.com. Their first augmented reality app, Flow, provided both object and barcode recognition. It was released in 2011.

A9 visual search technology powered features to let customers search for certain products (such as shoes) by shape, and find visually similar items on Amazon.com, Zappos.com, Endless.com, and other retail sites.. In 2023, Visual Search was rebranded as Visual Shopping, and re-introduced to the public as Lens.

=== Advertising technology ===
A9's advertising technology group began delivering sponsored link advertisements on the Amazon.com retail Web site in 2003 and continued to manage this program for Amazon properties. A9 also invested in display advertising technology, including technology for Amazon's ad-supported e-reader, the Kindle with special offers.
