= Permanent =

Permanent may refer to:

== Art and entertainment ==
- Permanent (film), a 2017 American film
- Permanent (Joy Division album)
- "Permanent" (song), by David Cook
- "Permanent", a song by Alex Lahey from The Answer Is Always Yes, 2023

== Other uses ==
- Permanent (mathematics), a concept in linear algebra
- Permanent (cycling event)
- Permanent wave, a hairstyling process

== See also ==
- Permanence (disambiguation)
- Permanently, a 2000 album by Mark Wills
- Endless (disambiguation)
- Eternal (disambiguation)
- Forever (disambiguation)
- Impermanence, Buddhist concept
