= ESobi =

Type of information management tool

eSobi
- Developer: esobi Inc.
- Stable release: 2.5.5.305 / January 18, 2008; 18 years ago
- Operating system: Microsoft Windows (including Windows Mobile), Android
- Type: Aggregator
- License: Shareware
- Website: www.esobi.com

eSobi was an integrated desktop-based information management tool and a standalone news aggregator that used to be delivered with worldwide Acer computers. eSobi was a shareware application and the full version of eSobi consisted of four functions: (1) an RSS reader, (2) a podcast receiver, (3) a meta-search engine, and (4) a data library.

eSobi supported both 32-bit and 64-bit Windows 7 and Windows Vista, as well as Windows XP.

== History ==
eSobi was first developed by esobi Inc. of Taipei, Taiwan in 2006 for Windows computers. It started out as the very first in the market to combine an RSS reader, a meta-search engine, and a scrapbook all in one application, aiming to ease information overload of the Web. Recent updates (September 2009) added a podcast receiver and features a new UI design.

Since 2008, Acer had bundled the simpler version of eSobi on its computers, including the popular netbook Acer Aspire One. This version of eSobi included only the RSS reader and data library; both are free with the purchase of Acer computers. eSobi used to also be the software partner of Transcend Information, Inc. and the 90-day trial version used to be delivered with selected Transcend's JetFlash USB flash drives.

eSobi for Windows Mobile and Android platforms used to also be available.

== Reviews ==
eSobi received a CNET Download.com 5-star editor’s review and a Softpedia 4-star “Very Good” editor’s review in 2009.

== Features of eSobi for Windows PC ==
- An RSS reader that handled feed subscriptions
- News Watch for monitoring news of targeted topics set by keywords
- Full-page, summary, and text-only reading modes
- Offline readability
- A podcast receiver with a download manager
- A built-in Windows Media Player for quick play of audio and video files
- A meta-search tool for retrieving results from multiple search engines simultaneously
- A quick search tool for finding information by category (RSS feeds, blogs, travel, shopping, answers, etc.)
- Automatic RSS feeds detection during browsing
- Search History for storing entire search results including keywords and tabs
- A data library where users could have stored, categorized, organized, edited and viewed web pages offline

== See also ==
- List of feed aggregators
