= DYGL =

Indie band

- Origin: Tokyo, Japan
- Genres: Indie rock, alternative rock, punk rock
- Occupation: Rock band
- Instruments: Guitars, bass, drums
- Years active: 2013–present
- Label: Hard Enough
- Spinoff of: Ykiki Beat
- Members: Nobuki Akiyama; Kohei Kamoto; Yosuke Shimonaka; Yotaro Kachi
- Website: dayglotheband.com

DYGL are a four-piece indie rock band from Tokyo, Japan.

Three members of the band, Akiyama, Kachi, and Kamoto, were also members of five-piece indie rock band Ykiki Beat, which officially disbanded in 2017.

== Band members ==
- Nobuki Akiyama – lead vocals, guitars
- Kohei Kamoto – drums
- Yosuke Shimonaka – guitar
- Yotaro Kachi – bass

== Biography ==
DYGL is a band formed in Tokyo, Japan. Previously they were Ykiki Beat but disbanded and reunited under a new name and some new members.

The band released their first EP recorded in the United States. As Nobuki Akiyama (Vocalist) said that their first album would be the first step for public recognition, they successfully released the 1st album in April 2017, which was produced by Albert Hammond Jr. With huge support from Albert, DYGL did an Asia tour, a Japan tour and did some performances the United Kingdom and United States.

== Discography ==
=== Albums ===
==== Studio albums ====
Title	Album details	Peak chart positions
Title	Album details	JPN Oricon
Who's in the House?	Released: August 13, 2025; Label: Hard Enough; Formats: CD, LP, Digital Download	-
Thirst	Released: December 9, 2022; Label: Hard Enough; Formats: CD, LP, Digital Download	-
A Daze in a Haze	Released: July 7, 2021; Label: Hard Enough; Formats: CD, Digital Download	30
Songs of Innocence & Experience	Released: July 3, 2019; Label: Hard Enough; Formats: CD, Digital Download	38
Say Goodbye to Memory Den	Released: April 19, 2017; Label: Hard Enough; Formats: CD, Digital Download	37

==== Extended plays ====
Title	Album details	Peak chart positions
Title	Album details	JPN Oricon
Don't Know Where It Is	Released: 4 May 2016; Label: Hard Enough; Formats: CD, LP, Digital Download	128
First EP	Released: 1 June 2015; Label: Self-released; Formats: Digital Download	-

=== Singles ===
Year	Single	Peak chart positions	Album
Year	Single	JPN Oricon	Album
2021	"Half of Me"	-	A Daze In A Haze
2021	"Did We Forget How To Dream In The Daytime?"	-	A Daze In A Haze
2021	"Banger"	-	A Daze In A Haze
2021	"Sink"	-	A Daze In A Haze
2019	"Don't You Wanna Dance in This Heaven?"	-	Songs of Innocence & Experience
2019	"A Paper Drean"	-	Songs of Innocence & Experience
2018	"Bad Kicks" / "Hard to Love"	-	Songs of Innocence & Experience
2017	"Let it out" / "Let it Sway"	-	Say Goodbye to Memory Den
2016	"Waste of Time" / "Sightless"	-	Say Goodbye to Memory Den
2014	"Let's Get Into Your Car"	-	First EP; Don't Know Where It Is
