= Knol =

Google publishing project (2007–2011)

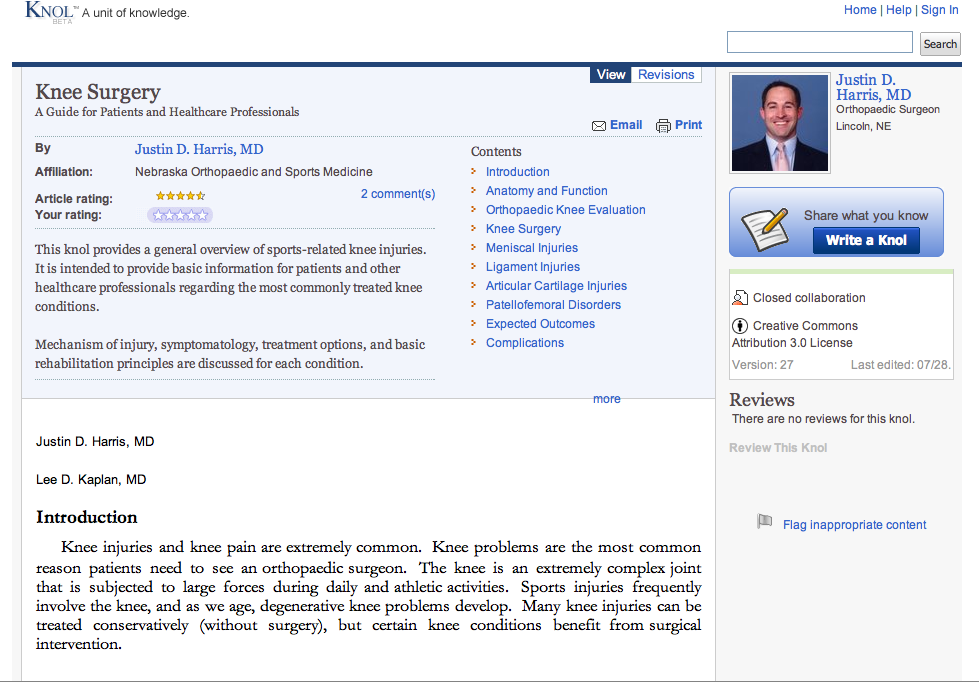
- A knol on knee surgery
- Website type: Reference
- Dissolved: October 1, 2012
- Owner: Google
- Creator: Google
- Website: knol.google.com (offline)
- Commercial: Yes
- Registration: Yes
- Launched: July 23, 2008; 18 years ago
- Current status: Closed

Knol was a Google project that aimed to include user-written articles on a range of topics. The lower-case term knol, which Google defined as a "unit of knowledge", referred to an article in the project. Knol was often viewed as a rival to Wikipedia.

The project was led by Udi Manber, a Google vice president of engineering. It was announced on December 13, 2007, and was opened in beta version on July 23, 2008, with a few hundred articles, mostly in the health and medical field.

Knol did not find a significant audience and became viewed as a failure. The project was closed on April 30, 2012, and all content was deleted after October 1, 2012. The Internet Archive has snapshots of Knol archived between July 2008 and May 2012.

== Operation ==
Any contributor could create and own new Knol articles, and there could be multiple articles on the same topic with each written by a different author.

Authors could also choose to include ads from Google's AdSense on their pages. This profit-sharing was criticized as incentivizing self-promotion or spam.

All contributors to the Knol project had to sign in with a Google account and were supposed to state their real names. Contributions were licensed by default under the Creative Commons CC-BY-3.0 license (which allowed anyone to reuse the material as long as the original author was named), but authors were also able to choose the CC-BY-NC-3.0 license (which prohibits commercial reuse) or traditional copyright protection instead. Knol employed "nofollow" outgoing links, using an HTML directive to prevent links in its articles from influencing search-engine rankings.

== Reception ==
=== Competition ===
Knol was described both as a rival and as a complement to Wikipedia, offering a different format that addressed many of Wikipedia's shortcomings. BBC News reported that "Many experts saw the initiative as an attack on the widely used Wikipedia communal encyclopaedia." The non-profit Wikimedia Foundation, which owned the name Wikipedia and the servers hosting the Wikipedia projects, welcomed the Google Knol initiative, saying that "The more good free content, the better for the world." While Wikipedia articles were written collectively under a "neutral point of view" policy, Knol aimed to highlight personal expertise by emphasizing authorship.

After Knol's beta launch, Google product manager Cedric Dupont responded to the idea that Google intended Knol to be a "Wikipedia killer" by saying, "Google is very happy with Wikipedia being so successful. Anyone who tries to kill them would hurt us." The New York Times noted similarities in design between Knol and Wikipedia, such as use of the same font. Dupont responded that the use was simply a coincidence as it is a commonly used font.

Because of Knol's format, some said Knol would be more like About.com than Wikipedia. According to Wolfgang Hansson, a writer at DailyTech, Knol may have been planned for About.com originally when it was up for acquisition. Hansson reported that several sources close to the sale said Google was planning to acquire About.com, but the executives at About.com learned Google was planning to move from About.com's model to a wiki-style model. That would have meant layoffs for all 500 or so "Guides" at About.com.

=== Conflict of interest ===
After Google's announcement of the project in December 2007, there was speculation on its motives and its position as a producer of content rather than as an organizer. The Guardian's Jack Schofield argued that "Knol represents an attack on the media industry in general."

There was debate whether Google search results could remain neutral because of possible conflict of interest. According to Danny Sullivan, the editor of Search Engine Land, "Google's goal of making Knol pages easy to find on search engines could conflict with its need to remain unbiased." Jeff Chester, executive director of the Center for Digital Democracy, raised similar concerns:

At the end of the day, there's a fundamental conflict between the business Google is in and its social goals. What you're seeing here, slowly, is Google embracing an advertising-driven model, in which money will have a greater impact on what people have ready access to.

As a response to such concerns, it was said that Google already hosted large amounts of content in sites like Google Sites, YouTube, Blogger and Google Groups, and that there was no significant difference in this case.

== Closure ==
The media attention that Google Knol received at its launch soon dissipated. The site failed to gain a large readership – by mid-2009, Knol as a whole was getting only about 175,000 views a month, compared to Wikipedia, whose views accumulated into the billions. As a result, the financial model behind Knol was never realized. Google stopped promoting Knol, and two years after its inception, few people were aware of Knol's existence.

During 2010, the Knol site suffered significant downtime, but it appeared that Google did not even realize that Knol was down until it was queried about it by a media outlet. In November 2011 the official declaration was made that Knol would be coming to an end, as part of a "spring cleaning, out of season" that Google was doing of unsuccessful projects and initiatives. As a TechCrunch writer said when the notice was made, this "comes as something of a surprise to me – because I figured Google had already shut it down."

== See also ==
- eHow
- Google Answers
