= Permanence =

Permanence is the state of being permanent:

- Digital permanence
- Object permanence
- Print permanence

In popular culture:

- Permanence (novel) by Karl Schroeder

In science:

- The inverse of inductance.

In music:

- Permanence (album), a 2015 album by No Devotion

== See also ==
- Impermanence, the opposite of permanence and an essential doctrine of Buddhism
- Permanent (disambiguation)
- Principle of permanence (mathematics)
