= Endless =

Endless or The Endless may refer to:

== Business ==
- Endless (private equity), a British firm
- Endless.com, an e-commerce website selling shoes and accessories
- Endless Computers, an American operating system company

== Film ==
- The Endless (film), a 2017 American film
- Endless (2020 film), an American film

== Music ==
=== Albums ===
- Endless (Frank Ocean album), 2016
- Endless (The McClymonts album) or the title song, 2017
- Endless (EP) or the title song, by Unearth, 2002
- Endless, by Red Flag, 2019
- Endless, by Ov Sulfur, 2026

=== Songs ===
- "Endless" (Inna song), 2011
- "Endless" (Sakanaction song), 2011
- "Endless" (VAX song), 2018
- "Endless", by Cory Asbury from Reckless Love, 2018
- "Endless", by Dave Gahan from Hourglass, 2007
- "Endless", by Dickie Valentine, 1954
- "Endless", by the McGuire Sisters, 1956
- "Endless", by Toto from Isolation, 1984
- "Endless", by Zara Larsson from 1, 2014

== Other uses ==
- Endless (artist), British graffiti and street artist
- Endless (comics) or The Endless, a fictional group of characters in the comic book series The Sandman
- Endless Mountains, Pennsylvania, US
- Endless mode, a special challenge mode in some video games; See Glossary of video game terms
- Ndless, a jailbreak for the TI-Nspire series

== See also ==
- Eternity, a limitless amount of time
- Infinity, a mathematical, philosophical and theological concept of endlessness
- Forever (disambiguation)
- Unlimited (disambiguation)
