= Forever (Ykiki Beat song) =

Single by Ykiki Beat

from the album When the World is Wide
- Released: 5 June 2014 (original digital release); 18 May 2016 (12-inch single re-release)
- Genre: Pop rock
- Length: 4:20
- Label: P-Vine Records
- Songwriter(s): Nobuki Akiyama; Kohei Kamoto

Ykiki Beat singles chronology
| "Garden" (2013) | "Forever" (2014) | "Forever" (2016) |

Music video
- "Forever" on YouTube

"Forever" is the debut single by Japanese band Ykiki Beat, from their debut LP When the World is Wide, released initially on June 5, 2014 as a digital single. It was re-released on May 18, 2016 as a 12-inch single with another remix tracks.

== Track listing ==
Digital download and 7-inch single
| No. | Title | Length |
|---|---|---|
| 1. | "Forever" | 4:20 |
| 2. | "Forever" (Boys Get Hurt Remix) | 5:03 |

12-inch single re-release
| No. | Title | Length |
|---|---|---|
| 1. | "Forever" | 4:20 |
| 2. | "Forever" (Jesse Ruins Remix) |

== Chart history ==
=== Weekly charts ===
==== Original release ====
| Chart (2015) | Peak position |
|---|---|
| Japan (Japan Hot 100) (Billboard) | 91 |

==== 12-inch re-release ====
| Chart (2016) | Peak position |
|---|---|
| Japan (Oricon Singles Chart) | 136 |
