= Ykiki Beat =

Japanese indie pop band

- Origin: Tokyo, Japan
- Genres: indie pop, dream pop, synth pop, pop rock
- Years active: 2012–2016
- Label: P-Vine Records
- Members: Nobuki Akiyama; Kohei Kamoto; Koki Nozue; Yotaro Kachi; Mizuki Sekiguchi

Ykiki Beat was a five-piece indie pop band from Tokyo, Japan.

In January, 2017, they announced they had been on hiatus from December, 2016 and that they would disband. They also announced that each member would continue to make music their own way. Three members of the band, Akiyama, Kachi, and Kamoto, are currently members of four-piece indie rock band DYGL. Drummer Mizuki Sekigushi is currently a member of four-piece indie rock band Cairophenomenons.

== Band members ==
- Nobuki Akiyama – lead vocals, guitars
- Kohei Kamoto - guitar
- Koki Nozue - synthesizer
- Yotaro Kachi - bass
- Mizuki Sekiguchi - drum

== Discography ==
=== Albums ===
==== Studio albums ====
Title	Album details	Peak chart positions	
Title	Album details	JPN Oricon	JPN Billboard
When the World is Wide	Released: 22 July 2015; Label: P-Vine Records; Formats: CD, LP, digital download	58	56

==== Extended plays ====
Title	EP details	Peak chart positions	
Title	EP details	JPN Oricon	JPN Billboard
Tired of Dreams	Released: 6 December 2013; Label: Self-released; Formats: digital download	—	-

=== Singles ===
==== As lead artist ====
Year	Single	Peak chart positions			Album
Year	Single	JPN Oricon	JPN Hot 100	JPN Radio	Album
2014	"Forever"	-	91	17	When the World is Wide
2016	"Forever" (re-release)	136	-	-	When the World is Wide

==== Promotional singles ====
Year	Title	Album
2013	"Garden"	Tired of Dreams

=== Other appearances ===
List of non-single guest appearances, with other performing artists, showing year released and album name
Title	Year	Album
"Garden"	2013	Sauna Cool 1
"Garden"	2014	Bonjour Colette
"Forever"	2015	magazine nero presents Flaming Fountain: mixtape vol. 1 "we forget all, don't we?"
