= DailyTech =

Technology news website (defunct)

- Website type: Technology daily publication
- Owners: DailyTech, LLC
- Creator: Kristopher Kubicki
- Editor: Jason Mick
- Website: http://www.dailytech.wiki (archived)
- Commercial: Yes
- Launched: 2005
- Current status: Defunct

DailyTech was an online daily publication of technology news, founded by ex-AnandTech editor Kristopher Kubicki on January 1, 2005. The site featured a prominent "comments" section that acted as the forums for the publication. Users were able to moderate or respond to each post, a template the editor admitted borrowing from Slashdot. The operating revenue for DailyTech was primarily dependent on advertising, with syndication of their news feed also providing some revenue.

== Overview ==
The schism between DailyTech and AnandTech occurred in goodwill, with the goal of establishing DailyTech as a news site that would not be bound by the NDAs that AnandTech has signed. Anand Lal Shimpi is frequently quoted and featured on DailyTech; however, the two publications compete against each other for readership. The DailyTech news feed is also used by other technology and science websites.

As of early December 2015 the website appeared to be inactive, although there was no notice of a change in status. Activity resumed in 2016, but as of May 2021, the web site is no longer available; archives show the last posted article was in late 2017.

== Writing style ==
DailyTech combined blog-style news with industry interviews and frequent roadmap leaks. The DailyTech editor had a frequent history of run-ins with writers from other publications. He has publicly denounced the writings from competitor Tom's Hardware, Gizmodo, HardOCP, The Inquirer and DigiTimes.

DailyTech consistently leaked several generations of GPUs and CPUs. The company attributed this to the standing instruction that DailyTech writers were not allowed to sign disclosure agreements or embargoes.

On June 5, 2007, the site published a report on the levels of corruption present at other technology news and review websites. 7 out of 35 sites polled accepted some kind of advertising-for-content exchange.
