= Für immer =

Für immer (German for forever) may refer to:

- "Für immer" (Die Ärzte song), 1986
- "Für immer" (Warlock song), 1987
- Für Immer (video), a double DVD video album by former Warlock singer Doro Pesch
- "Für Immer", a song by Neu!
- "Für immer", a song by Böhse Onkelz from Weiß
- Für immer (D.A.F. album), 1982
- "Für immer" (Unheilig song)
- Für immer, a 2019 album by Seiler und Speer

== See also ==
- Forever (disambiguation)
