= Anand Lal Shimpi =

American technology journalist and founder of AnandTech

- Born: June 26, 1982 (age 44)
- Education: William G. Enloe High School; North Carolina State University
- Occupations: Employee of Apple; Founder and former CEO of AnandTech
- Writing career
- Genre: Technology journalism

Anand Lal Shimpi (born June 26, 1982) is a former tech journalist and American businessman who is the founder of the technology website AnandTech, a hardware news/review site. He wrote a book in 2001, titled The Anandtech Guide to PC Gaming Hardware. He retired at the age of 32 from the publishing industry to join the hardware division at Apple Inc. in 2014.

Shimpi started AnandTech when he was 15 years old. The site originally focused on motherboard reviews and was hosted on GeoCities. Over a period of 17 years, the site grew to be one of the most respected sites for tech reviews.

== Early life ==
Anand Shimpi was born to Lalchand Shimpi, an Indian-born computer science professor at St Augustine's University, and Razieh, an Iranian-born teacher in Raleigh, North Carolina. When Shimpi was in third grade, his father enrolled him in a computer course. He built his first PC in sixth grade and soon began building PCs for others. He is a graduate of William G. Enloe GT/IB Center for the Humanities, Sciences, and the Arts and North Carolina State University with a degree in Computer Engineering with emphasis on microprocessor architecture and design.

== Career ==
Shimpi started AnandTech in 1997 at the age of 15. He called it Anand's Hardware Tech Page. He first started reviewing motherboards; later he would go on to review CPUs, hard drives, RAM, and other computer components. His tech reviews were in-depth and thorough, making it the preferred site for hardware engineers and enthusiasts and receiving praise from spokespersons at AMD and Intel. He served as its editor-in-chief from 1997 to 2014. AnandTech grew from a small GeoCities website in 1997 to a 50 million page view per month publication as of July 2005. He reportedly was able to get his hands on an AMD K6-III before any other reviewers.

In 2013 he was named as an expert in the BBC's coverage of the Xbox One and PlayStation 4.

On August 30, 2014, he announced his decision to retire from the technology publishing industry to work at Apple's hardware technologies division and named longtime AnandTech editor Ryan Smith as his successor.

On February 15, 2020, Bloomberg reported that Anand sent confidential documents to Gerard Williams III after the latter had left Apple to form NUVIA.

== Publications ==
Shimpi is the author of the book The AnandTech Guide to PC Gaming Hardware (ISBN 0-7897-2626-2).
