= Tom's Guide =

Technology and lifestyle website

- Website type: Technology journalism, entertainment journalism, lifestyle journalism
- Founded: 2007
- Headquarters: New York City, United States
- Country of origin: United States
- Owner: Future plc
- Editor: Mark Spoonauer
- CEO: Kevin Li-Ying
- Industry: Consumer technology journalism
- Parent: Future plc
- Website: TomsGuide.com
- Commercial: Yes
- Current status: Active

Tom's Guide is an American and British technology news website that primarily reviews and reports on consumer technology, produces buying guides, and publishes how-to articles. It operates out of three main offices, one in Manhattan, New York City, one in London, United Kingdom, and the other in Bath, United Kingdom. Having launched as its own site in 2007, Tom's Guide is owned by UK-based Future plc.

== Editorial content ==
Tom's Guide reviews consumer technology products, grading on a five-star scale, with 1 being "very poor and among the worst products we've tested" and 5 being "best of the best and close to perfect". In addition to reviews, the site publishes buying guides, covering products its staffers have reviewed. The site also publishes news articles, "how to watch" articles, and e-commerce articles focused on personal electronics. A 2021 Digiday article reported that "a mattress buying guide on Tom's Guide sells eight mattresses a day."

=== Editorial independence ===
The site stresses its editorial independence: "No outside party determines what products we review or the content of our reviews." Tom's Guide is a member of the UK-based Independent Press Standards Organisation.

=== Criticism ===
In 2014, Adweek questioned the strategy of Tom's Guide's then-owner, Purch, to allow brands to buy ad pages that also included editorial reviews. This allowed companies to sponsor pages that contain editorial reviews of the company's own products.

=== Video game reviews ===
On the OpenCritic hub for Tom's Guide, the publication had a 76.3 average score and 80 median score after reviewing nearly 300 video games. It recommended 82.4% of video games as of January 2025.

== Readership fluctuations and article output growth ==
Since spinning off from Tom's Hardware in 2007, Tom's Guide has regularly surpassed its former home site in audience and readership. According to a profile of the publication in Niche Pursuits, Tom's Guide received 25 million visitors a month in June 2022: "Although Tom's Guide came after [Tom's Hardware], the site's broader focus on all things consumer electronics has helped it take off to become one of the most successful affiliate sites on the planet." According to SEMRush in October 2025, Tom's Guide received 28.92 million global visits, and Tom's Hardware received 21.15 million global visits.

=== Readership decline ===
Site traffic to Tom's Guide decreased by 30% between February 2023, when the site received 41.7 million visits, and October 2025, when it received nearly 29 million monthly visits.

=== Article volume increases ===
The site ramped up its article production in the early 2020s:

- In November 2025, Tom's Guide published more than 1,800 articles, according to its archive.
- In November 2020, the site published 388 articles.
- In November 2015, the site published 85 articles.

== History and ownership ==
Tom's Guide was launched in September 2007, a rebrand of Gear Digest and spinoff of Tom's Hardware, as a more generalist guide to consumer technology. Bestofmedia Group acquired TG Publishing in April 2007, which owned and operated Tom's Hardware, Gear Digest, and several other online media brands.

In July 2013, Bestofmedia Group was acquired by TechMediaNetwork, Inc., which changed its name to Purch in April 2014. In 2015, Tom's Guide's then-owner, Purch, was profiled in Digiday for its strategy of making commerce a key part of its business. In 2014, approximately $55 million of Purch's $100 million in revenue came from e-commerce purchases, according to the Digiday. Future plc purchased Purch, which owned Tom's Guide, for $132 million in July 2018. The publication is named after Thomas Pabst, who also founded Tom's Hardware in 1996. Tom's Guide's initial focus was primarily as a "comprehensive buyer’s guide for consumer electronics and technology" according to a statement released at its launch.

In years since its founding, Tom's Guide has since expanded to cover fitness, home appliances, smart home technology, streaming services, and AI, among other subjects. In December 2024, Tom's Guide owner Future plc partnered with OpenAI to give ChatGPT users access to news and lifestyle content. Tom's Guide uses an AI tool called Advisor, which leverages OpenAI's LLM, to analyze articles to suggest more articles to readers, according to Digiday report on the tool.

== Editorial leadership and media appearances ==
Tom's Guide editors have appeared regularly on cable news and local news stations over the years to speak about consumer technology products and issues. Mark Spoonauer is the global editor-in-chief for Tom's Guide, having led the publication since 2013. Prior that role he had been editor-in-chief at Laptop Magazine since 2003. Spoonauer frequently appears as a technology expert on television, having been featured on CNN, FOX 5 New York, CNBC, Fox Business, and NBC's The Today Show.

Mike Prospero is the U.S. editor-in-chief, overseeing the homes, smart home, and fitness/wearables categories. He has been an expert source for Fox 5 New York on smart home technology and for Microsoft Windows 10 for CNBC. He also reviews fitness equipment for the Tom's Guide YouTube channel. Prospero has appeared on ABC World News This Morning while employed by Fast Company.

=== Other notable staff members ===
Jeff Parsons is the UK editor-in-chief, and Kate Kozuch is managing editor for social media and video. Kozuch is a frequent guest on Cheddar to discuss CES, and Apple AirPods and Apple Intelligence. Jane McGuire, Tom's Guide's fitness editor, was previously an editor at Runner's World. John Velasco, senior channel editor for phones, is a frequent guest expert on News 12 New Jersey.

=== Masthead ===
The Tom's Guide masthead lists 51 staff members and four contributing writers.

== Social media ==
As of December 2025, Tom's Guide has more than 406,000 followers TikTok, and 115,000 subscribers on YouTube. Tom's Guide was an early participant in Snapchat's Dynamic Stories software, which automatically created Snapchat content based on information in a publisher's RSS feed.

== Awards ==
The Webby Awards recognized Tom's Guide with a 2025 Honoree award for its video review of the Apple Vision Pro.

== Tom's Guide Awards program ==
Tom's Guide has held the annual Tom's Guide Awards every July since 2020, in which it picks the best products in a range of categories, from phones to home appliances to computing to streaming. The winners are selected by the Tom's Guide editorial staff. The awards have been cited in earnings reports from Roku. In addition, Tom's Guide hands out its own Best of CES awards every year at the CES trade show in Las Vegas. The Best of CES awards have been cited in earnings reports from Vizio.
