= Bill Stasior =

American computer scientist

William F. Stasior Jr
- Education: B.S. M.S. and Ph.D. in Electrical Engineering
- Alma mater: Massachusetts Institute of Technology (MIT)
- Occupations: Corporate Vice President, Microsoft
- Employer: Microsoft

Bill Stasior (William F. Stasior Jr.) is an American computer scientist and technology executive. He best known for leading Apple's virtual-assistant group, Siri, from 2012 to 2019 and for subsequent senior artificial-intelligence roles at Microsoft. Prior to joining Apple, he co-founded and ran Amazon's search-technology subsidiary A9.com, serving on Jeff Bezos's senior "S-Team".

== Early life and education ==
Stasior earned his B.S., M.S. and Ph.D. in Electrical Engineering and Computer Science at the Massachusetts Institute of Technology (MIT). His doctoral research focused on interactive video processing and software-radio systems, with several technical reports published through MIT's Laboratory for Computer Science.

== Career ==
=== Early work (1995–2003) ===
After graduate school, Stasior joined Oracle as a senior engineer and later became Director of Advanced Development at AltaVista, where he worked on large-scale web-search and contextual-advertising platforms.

=== Amazon and A9.com (2003–2012) ===
Stasior joined Amazon in 2003 as Director of Search & Navigation and co-founded A9.com in 2004; he became its president and CEO in 2006. At A9 he oversaw product-search ranking, search advertising, and acquisitions such as the image-recognition start-up SnapTell in 2009. A 2009 Puget Sound Business Journal profile noted that A9 handled billions of product-search queries daily across Amazon's e-commerce sites.

=== Apple (2012–2019) ===
Apple recruited Stasior in October 2012 as Vice President, Siri & Search, to rebuild the assistant's natural-language and machine-learning teams. Under his leadership Siri expanded to more than 30 languages and shipped across iPhone, iPad, Watch, Mac and HomePod. He stepped down amid a broader AI re-organization in early 2019 and departed Apple that May.

=== Microsoft (2019–present) ===
Microsoft announced in August 2019 that Stasior would join as Corporate Vice President of Technology, reporting to chief technology officer Kevin Scott and focusing on company-wide AI strategy.

=== Board and advisory roles ===
In 2019, Stasior was appointed to the executive advisory committee at Avellino Labs.

In 2024, he was made a senior advisor at the Ontario Teachers' Pension Plan.

== Patents and publications ==
Stasior is listed as inventor on more than 50 U.S. patents spanning search ranking, vision-based commerce and conversational interfaces. He co-authored early peer-reviewed papers on multimedia systems while at MIT.

== Recognition ==
Technology media describe Stasior as a "search guru" and "prominent technologist" for his contributions to commercial search and voice AI.

== Personal life ==
According to public filings and professional profiles, Stasior resides in the San Francisco Bay Area and mentors early-stage technology founders.
