= AnandTech =

Defunct online computer hardware magazine owned by Future plc

- Screenshot
- Website type: Online computer hardware magazine
- Dissolved: August 30, 2024; 2 years ago
- Successor: Tom's Hardware
- Owner: Future plc
- Creator: Anand Lal Shimpi
- Editor: Ryan Smith (2014–close)
- Website: web.archive.org/web/20250726001129/https://www.anandtech.com
- Launched: April 1997; 29 years ago
- Current status: Magazine defunct; forum still active

AnandTech was an online computer hardware magazine owned by Future plc. It was founded in April 1997 by then-14-year-old Anand Lal Shimpi, who was CEO and editor-in-chief until August 2014, with Ryan Smith replacing him as editor-in-chief. The website was a source of hardware reviews for off-the-shelf components and exhaustive benchmarking, targeted towards computer-building enthusiasts, but later expanded to cover mobile devices such as smartphones and tablets.

Some of their articles on mass-market products such as mobile phones were syndicated by CNN Money. The large accompanying forum is recommended by some books for bargain hunting in the technology field. AnandTech was acquired by Purch on December 17, 2014. Purch was acquired by Future in 2018.

On August 30, 2024, the publication shut down. The content of the website was said to be preserved, but no new articles or reviews would be published. The AnandTech forums would continue to operate.

On August 1, 2025, the content of the main website was removed and most pages redirected to the forums.

== History ==
In its early stages, Matthew Witheiler was co-owner and Senior Hardware Editor, creating insightful and in-depth reviews for the site.

In 2006, an AnandTech editor launched a spin-off called DailyTech, a technology news site. The move followed a similar evolution of the news section of AnandTech's peer publication, Tom's Guide, into TG Daily some months earlier.

On December 17, 2014, Purch announced the acquisition of AnandTech.

In 2018, AnandTech and other Purch consumer brands were sold to Future.

The editorial team also included Senior Editor Ian Cutress (who departed in February 2022), as well as motherboard expert Gavin Bonshor. In January 2023, Gavin Bonshor was promoted to the Senior Editor position, effectively replacing Dr. Ian Cutress, the previous Senior Editor. Since AnandTech's shutdown and the colossal archive of data and content was scrubbed off the internet by its publisher, Future PLC, the ex-senior editor Gavin Bonshor created BonTech Labs, in which he intends to carry on testing PC hardware via AnandTech's previous and rigorous testing methodology. Gavin Bonshor also writes for EnosTech, which is another UK based technology publication.

On August 30, 2024, AnandTech announced that it had ended publication effective immediately and that the site will remain online as an archive, while its community forum will remain operational. However, on August 1, 2025, the contents of the site were removed with only the forum remaining.

== Reviews ==
Describing AnandTech in 2008, author Paul McFedries wrote, "Its heart and its claim to fame is the massive collection of incredibly in-depth reviews." In 2008, blogging expert Bruce C. Brown called AnandTech one of the "big dogs in the tech field". In 2005, computer expert Leo Laporte described AnandTech as an "outstanding review and technology website for 3D hardware and other computer components" and said that it is "one of the most professional hardware review sites online".

== Forums ==
AnandTech has over 350,000 registered users and over 35 million posts. The AnandTech forums are home to distributive computing teams, known collectively as TeAm AnandTech (or simply The TeAm).

In July 2007, the forum underwent major changes that site administrators stated as necessary for furthering userbase growth. The profanity filter was removed (although use of vulgar language is limited), and the identities of traditionally anonymous volunteer moderators were revealed (except two).

== See also ==
- List of Internet forums
- CNET
- Maximum PC
- TechCrunch
- The Tech Report
- Tom's Hardware
- ZDNet
