= Udi Manber =

Israeli computer scientist

- אודי מנבר
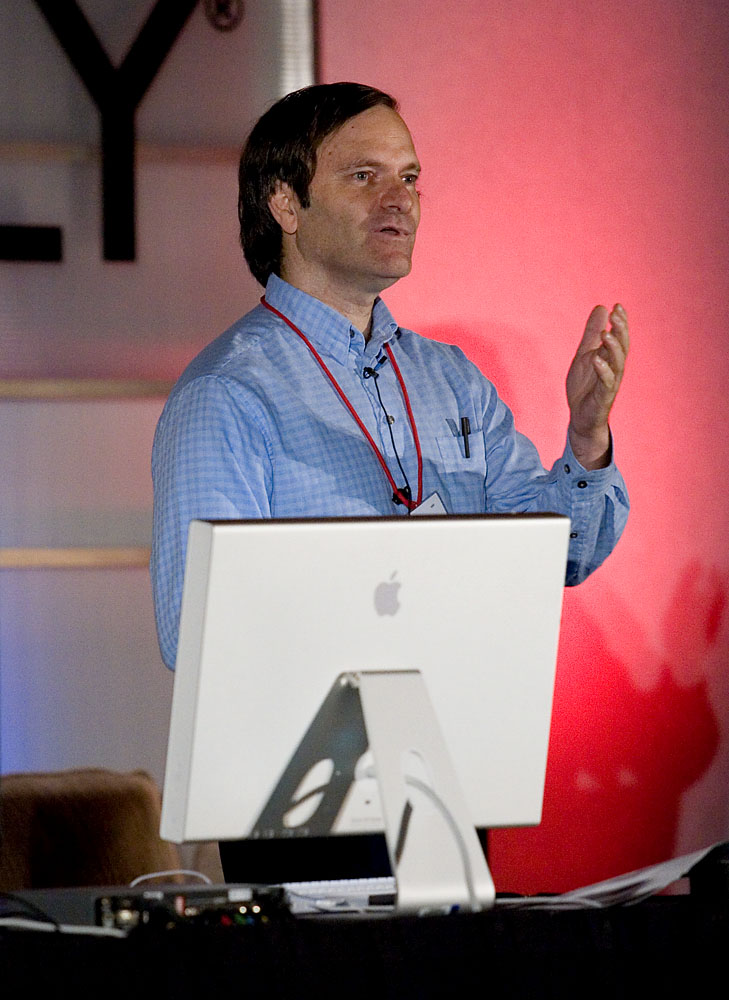
- Udi Manber at the 2005 Where 2.0 Conference
- Awards: Presidential Young Investigator Award
- Scientific career
- Institutions: University of California, San Francisco; National Institutes of Health; Google; Yahoo! University of Washington; University of Arizona; University of Wisconsin-Madison; Amazon.com; A9.com
- Thesis: Concurrency Control for Dynamic Data Structures and Fault Tolerance (1982)
- Doctoral advisor: Richard E. Ladner

Udi Manber (Hebrew: אודי מנבר) is an Israeli computer scientist. He is one of the authors of agrep and GLIMPSE. After a career in engineering and management, he worked on medical research.

== Education ==
He earned both his bachelor's degree in 1975 in mathematics and his master's degree in 1978 from the Technion in Israel. At the University of Washington, he earned another master's degree in 1981 and his PhD in computer science in 1982.

== Career ==
He has won a Presidential Young Investigator Award in 1985, 3 best-paper awards, and the Usenix annual Software Tools User Group Award software award in 1999. Together with Gene Myers he developed the suffix array, a data structure for string matching.

He was an associate professor at the University of Wisconsin-Madison and then later a professor at the University of Arizona and authored several articles while there, including "Using Induction to Design Algorithms" summarizing his textbook (which remains in print) Introduction to Algorithms: A Creative Approach.

He became the chief scientist at Yahoo! in 1998.

In 2002, he joined Amazon.com, where he became "chief algorithms officer" and a vice president. He later was appointed CEO of the Amazon subsidiary company A9.com. He filed a patent on behalf of Amazon. In 2004, Google promoted sponsored listings for its own recruiting whenever someone searched for his name on Google's search engine.

In 2006, he was hired by Google as one of their vice presidents of engineering. In December 2007, he announced Knol, Google's project to create a knowledge repository.

In October 2010, he was responsible for all the search products at Google.

In October 2014, Manber was named the vice president of engineering at YouTube.

In February 2015, Manber announced that he was leaving YouTube for the National Institutes of Health. He left the role in 2016.

In February 2017, Manber went to work for the Department of Medicine at the University of California, San Francisco and a technical advisor to UCSF's Institute for Computational Health Sciences.

In October 2018, it was reported that Manber was joining Anthem as its chief AI officer.
