= Forever (website) =

Digital archive and storage company

- Forever website home page screenshot
- Website type: Digital preservation
- Available in: English
- Headquarters: Pittsburgh, Pennsylvania
- Founder: Glen Meakem
- Industry: Internet
- Website: www.forever.com
- Registration: Required
- Launched: May 2012
- Current status: Active

Forever.com is a digital archive and internet storage startup company for photographs, documents, videos, and audio files. Founded in May 2012 by Glen Meakem, the company is headquartered in Pittsburgh, Pennsylvania.

== History ==
Forever was founded in May 2012 by Glen Meakem and publicly launched in November 2013. 1,000 people became Forever members prior to its public launch on November 22, 2013. It is a digital archive and internet storage startup company for photographs, documents, videos, and audio files. In 1990, Meakem and his wife went on a summer road trip from their Boston home to the states of Delaware, Connecticut, New York, Kentucky, and Florida to visit and film all of their living relatives, including their six grandparents. Their goal was to record their relatives' history. He conceived of Forever during the trip. Meakem wanted to create an enduring Internet archive for all of his family photos, and he turned the idea into the company Forever.

In December 2012, Forever received its series A round funding of $9 million from the venture capital firm Meakem Becker, which was co-founded by Forever founder Glen Meakem. In December 2012, Forever moved to the twentieth floor of PPG Place in Downtown Pittsburgh, Pennsylvania, where it is based. In November 2013, the advertising efforts of Forever helped it gain 1,000 paying customers. In December 2013, Forever had a Series B round of funding of $8.6 million.

== Acquisitions ==
In September 2014, Forever bought Panstoria, a digital scrapbooking company. The purchase allowed Forever customers to use Panstoria's scrapbooking services and permitted Forever to advertise its services to Panstoria's 100,000 customers.

In September 2015, Forever bought Life Highlights Digital Media, a Wisconsin company established in 2011 by Brenda Broberg, that helped customers digitize family photos and videos. Forever turned Life Highlights' store in Green Bay, Wisconsin, into a Forever Retail Store. In March 2016, Forever expanded the store's functionality also to be their North American Media Conversion and Processing place, to digitize customers' photos and videos. In March 2018, Forever had 55 employees.

== Services ==
According to Barron's, Forever aims to differentiate itself from other online photo storage services like Google Photos, Amazon Prime Photos, Dropbox, and Shutterfly by additionally offering customized help. Customer service representatives on its toll-free telephone number offer advice about how to create greeting cards or digital scrapbooks. Forever helps customers convert VHS cassettes into digital files and pledges to convert the files' types into any new file types used in the future.

Forever gives users free 2 gigabyte accounts. Users who want to store more photos past the 2 GB limit have the option of paying for a minimum of 10 GB or a maximum of 1 terabyte.

Forever backs up the data in three places different places around the world and uses bank-grade encryption to protect the data.

== Forever Guarantee Fund ==
Forever created a "fully-restricted fund" named the Forever Guarantee Fund. According to WTAQ, the fund "acts like a permanent endowment or reserve". Forever invested $1 million into the fund when establishing it and adds more money from customers' payments. Of customer's payments, the company places 70% into the fund and invests the other 30% into operational expenses and expanding its services. According to Forever founder, Glen Meakem, the fund is invested in a diversified collection of stocks and bonds and targets an 8% annual return. 4% of the fund's profits is withdrawn every year to cover operational expenses.

The fund's aim is to allow Forever to maintain customers' accounts for a century after the customers' deaths. But David Thaw, an information security specialist at the University of Pittsburgh School of Law, found the Forever 100-year warranty to be uncertain if Forever closes, noting, "As with all things, you can't make perfect guarantees and ensure they will be followed because things can happen." Forever terms of service dictates that if Forever cannot sustain customers' accounts, it will use the Forever Guarantee Fund to give the customers' data back to Forever customers.

== Reception ==
Michael Spring, a professor at the University of Pittsburgh School of Information Sciences, said, "It seems a little overpriced. It may end up being a service used more by those who have disposable income".

In an April 2018 Photography Life review, Bob Vishneski, who works in the media software industry, wrote, "as people begin to grasp and appreciate the importance of Digital Estate Planning, I believe Forever and others that venture into this space will gain traction. At a minimum, people concerned with having their digital archives live on after they are gone should ensure that their wills include account names and passwords to the various services they subscribe to."
