= Tom's Hardware =

Online publication owned by Future

- Screenshot of the website in December 2024
- Website type: Technology website
- Available in: English, French, Italian, Russian, Turkish
- Owner: Future plc
- Creator: Thomas Pabst
- Editor: Paul Alcorn
- Website: tomshardware.com
- Launched: April 1996; 30 years ago
- Current status: Active

Tom's Hardware is an online publication owned by Future plc and focused on technology. It was founded in 1996 by Thomas Pabst. It provides articles, news, price comparisons, videos and reviews on computer hardware and high technology. The site features coverage on CPUs, motherboards, RAM, PC cases, graphics cards, display technology, power supplies and displays, storage, smartphones, tablets, gaming, consoles, and computer peripherals.

Tom's Hardware has a forum and featured blogs.

== History ==
Tom's Hardware was founded in 1996 as Tom's Hardware Guide in Canada by Thomas Pabst. It started using the domain tomshardware.com in September 1997 and was followed by several foreign language versions, including Italian, French, Finnish and Russian based on franchise agreements.

While the initial testing labs were in Germany and California, much of Tom's Hardware's testing now occurs in New York and a facility in Ogden, Utah, owned by its parent company. In April 2007, the site was acquired by the French company Bestofmedia Group. In July 2013, that company was acquired by TechMediaNetwork, Inc., which changed its name to Purch in April 2014. Purch's consumer brands, including Tom's Hardware, were acquired by Future in 2018.

The site celebrated its 20th anniversary in May 2016. Beyond continuous publication of the website, it is known for its overclocking championships and other contests.

The site launched Tom's Hardware Premium, a subscription-only offering, on Aug. 6, 2025.

== Editors ==
Paul Alcorn took over as editor-in-chief of Tom's Hardware in June 2025 from Avram Piltch, who had served in the role since 2018. Prior to starting the position, Alcorn served as lead editor for CPU content. Before Piltch, John A. Burek, formerly of Computer Shopper, briefly held the role of editor in chief.

Burek succeeded Fritz Nelson, who served from August 2014 through 2017. Other former editors-in-chief include Chris Angelini (July 2008–July 2014), Patrick Schmid (2005–2006), David Strom (2005), Omid Rahmat (1999–2003) and founder Thomas Pabst (1996–2001).

== Related publications ==
Tom's Hardware is owned by Future plc, which also owns a number of other websites. In technology, those include Tom's Guide (formerly Gear Digest), Laptop Mag and AnandTech, as well as science sites like LiveScience and Space.com.

In March 2018 the German spin-off was to be closed because of the new data/privacy laws, but continued as an independent site (tomshw.de), with an exclusive license for the local usage of the brand name.

In July 2019 the license was returned. After that the German CEO and editor-in-chief of the gotIT! Tech Media GmbH started a new website Igor´sLAB and his own YouTube channel.

== Tom's Guide ==
Tom's Guide (formerly known as GearDigest) is an online publication owned by Future that focuses on technology, with editorial teams in the US, UK and Australia. Tom's Guide was launched in 2007 by Bestofmedia, which was subsequently acquired by TechMediaNetwork in 2013; in 2014, TechMediaNetwork changed its name to Purch, which was acquired by Future in 2018. Primarily focused on news, reviews, price comparisons, how-tos and guides, Tom's Guide also features opinion articles and deals content.

The site features coverage on CPUs, motherboards, RAM, PC cases, graphic cards, display technology, displays, storage, smartphones, tablets, gaming, consoles, fitness and health, home, smart home, streaming, security and computer peripherals.

It is the second-largest consumer technology, news and review site from the US with 68.4 million visits in September 2022.

=== History ===
Tom's Guide was originally launched as GearDigest by Bestofmedia before being renamed to Tom's Guide. The publication was subsequently acquired by TechMediaNetwork in 2013; in 2014, TechMediaNetwork changed its name to Purch, which was then acquired by Future in 2018.

While the initial testing labs were in Germany and California, much of Tom’s Guide's testing now occurs in New York and a facility in Ogden, Utah owned by its parent company, Purch.

In April 2007, the site was acquired by the French company Bestofmedia Group. In July 2013, that company was acquired by TechMediaNetwork, Inc., which changed its name to Purch in April 2014.

The site celebrated its 15th anniversary in 2022. Beyond continuous publication of the website, it is known for its annual CES awards and Tom's Guide Awards that are held in June and July each year.

=== Editors ===
Mark Spoonauer is the current Global Editor-in-Chief and has been since 2013. Before that, he worked as the Editor-in-Chief of Laptop Mag since 2003.

Mike Prospero is the current US Editor-in-Chief alongside Managing Editors Philip Michaels, Jason England, Nick Pino and Senior Deals Editor Louis Ramirez.

== See also ==
- CNET
- TechCrunch
- List of Internet forums
