= Endless (artist) =

British contemporary artist

Endless is a London-based contemporary artist.

Much of his work portrays a neutral homage to the key elements of society today, covering aspects such as brand worship, advertising, consumerism and celebrity culture. Endless makes much of his art on the streets, but his work can also be found in London galleries and in homes of well-established collectors across the world.

== Early career ==
Endless is inspired by popular culture, consumerism and advertising. In his artworks he addresses topics like wealthiness, sex and religion, often using recognisable symbols and logos, and describes a modern world where brands and celebrities are the new Gods to worship.

After 6 years of study, Endless graduated from Cambridge School Of Art, where he specialised in fine art and screen printing. Shortly after this, he moved to London and began sharing his ideas with the world in the form of street-art. Endless's first foray into the art world was over a decade ago through creating bold street art across London. His first major opportunity came from Ed Burstell in 2016, then the boss of high-end department store, Liberty. Upon noticing Endless's artwork whilst walking to work one day, Ed contacted Endless with an opportunity to paint the department stores main display window in honour of the 40 year anniversary of the punk movement. This made Endless the first ever street artist in history to paint the department stores coveted windows. Talking of the moment and the artist, Ed Burstell, said: "After spotting Endless' art dotted across the streets of London, I knew right away that he would be perfect to paint Liberty's tribute to the punk movement."

Endless boasts numerous collaborations with international artists including the British duo Gilbert and George and high-profile brands such as Karl Lagerfeld and Fiorucci. The artist made strides in the world of fashion, collaborating with Karl Lagerfeld on a SS20 capsule clothing collection, launched at the London Regent Street Store, followed by a commemorative solo exhibition - Endless Karl, at the Cris Contini Contemporary gallery in London. Endless also painted a large mural, live at Pitti Uomo in Florence, for the launch of their SS20 collection and was asked to design a white shirt in honour of Karl, alongside the likes of Kate Moss and Cara Delevingne in a Paris exhibition - A Tribute to Karl: The White Shirt Project. Endless also released a series of NFT artworks with Karl Lagerfeld in 2021 and 2022. Endless is the first artist since Keith Haring and Andy Warhol to collaborate with retro Italian fashion brand, Fiorucci, launching Limited Edition T-shirts and skateboard decks in their new London Soho store in 2019. Endless took part in a live-art performance at Paris Fashion Week in January 2020 with Clarks Originals, celebrating the 70th anniversary of the iconic Desert Boot. In spring 2022, Endless exhibited at the 59th International Art Exhibition - La Biennale di Venezia, representing the Republic of San Marino in an exhibition titled - Postumano Metamorfico – making him the first street artist in history to exhibit within the prestigious international exhibition.

Endless has been asked to paint within a number of iconic spots across London and Europe. He was responsible for decorating the OXO Tower Bar and Brasserie in London, he created Her Majesty mural for the 50 years of the Abbey Road album by the Beatles at the Abbey Road Studios and the first wall mural in Cortina d'Ampezzo, Italy.

== Recent Interventions, Exhibitions and News ==
Endless recently presented his self-portrait with Gilbert & George at the Uffizi Galleries, making him the first street-artist in history to add such artwork to the permanent collection in the Florentine Museum. His work also features in the glamorous Italian Ski town, Cortina D'Ampezzo, creating the town's first street-art mural in 2019 and more recently, a commemorative, commissioned mural in celebration of the 2021 Alpine Ski World Championships.

In 2021 Endless replicated in Milan The Queen & Culture Exhibition, which was held in London at the beginning of October 2020 in the evocative location of The Crypt Gallery in San Pancras. The same year, he made design and innovation made in Italy the setting for an exclusive artistic performance at Sanson Arredamenti in Sedico, Italy, breaking away from the traditional stereotype of the wall or canvas and creating its iconic Lizzy Vuitton, thus signing his first artist's cuisine. This is where his collaborations with manufactures and companies of excellence in the made in Italy began: from the creation of a limited-edition series of tableware in collaboration with Geminiano Cozzi Venezia 1765 to the conception of a series of street-art-inspired eyeglass frames in collaboration with Treviso-based optical store In Barberia. These creations were recently shown at the artist's first museum exhibition, Endless Treviso, at Casa Robegan in Treviso, which was followed by the exhibition Endless Palermo at Cantieri culturali alla Zisa in Palermo. Very successful was the interlude at the Venice Biennale in 2022 with his installation The Endless Transfiguration and a special performance with Elisabetta Franchi during the Vernissage of the exhibition at Palazzo Donà dalle Rose, Venice.

== Exhibitions and Performances: Highlights ==
- 22 October – 2 November 2016 - Worship - A solo exhibition by Endless featuring Gilbert & George, Graffik Gallery, London, UK
- February 2017 - Filth - A solo exhibition by Endless in collaboration with Buster & Punch, London, UK
- 26 April – 28 June 2017 - The Royal Variety Adornments - A solo exhibition by Endless with Motionless Fine Art, Chelsea Waterside Artspace, London, UK
- 3 August – 30 September 2017 - Beaut - a solo exhibition by Endless with Motionless Fine Art, Exhibitionist Hotel, Kensington, London, UK
- 12–20 June 2018 - Showing Gilbert & George Crotch Grab Artwork, Opera Gallery, London, UK
- 8 - 17 November 2019 - Endless Karl exhibition, Cris Contini Contemporary Gallery, London, UK in occasion of the launch of the Karl x Endless capsule collection at Karl Lagerfeld store, London, UK
- 5 - 8 December 2019 - Endless exhibiting at Art Basel with Rosenbaum Contemporary Gallery, Miami, USA
- Jan 2020 - Endless x Clarks – Abstract Live sculpture painting, honouring 70 years of the brand during Paris Fashion Week, France
- October 2020 - The Queen & Culture Exhibition, a solo exhibition by Endless with Cris Contini Contemporary, The Crypt Gallery, St. Pancras Church, London, UK
- February 2020 - Endless becomes the first Street Artist in the permanent collection of the Uffizi Galleries in Florence, Italy, donating his self-portrait with Gilbert and George titled – E x G&G
- March - May 2021 - The Queen & Culture Exhibition - A solo exhibition by Endless with Cris Contini Contemporary, Il Salotto di Milano, Milan, Italy
- Aug-Nov 2021 - Endless in Montenegro | The Story from Street to Canvas, Cris Contini Contemporary, Porto Montenegro
- Dec 2021 - Beyond Vesuvius, curated by Pasquale Lettieri, Villa Giudy, Palma Campania, Naples, Italy
- April 2022 - The 59th International Art Exhibition - La Biennale di Venezia - The Endless Transfiguration, project curated by Pasquale Lettieri for Metamorphic Posthuman, Pavilion of the Republic of San Marino, Palazzo Donà dalle Rose, Fondamenta Nove, Cannaregio, Venice, Italy
- June - Nov 2022 - Glass Stress – State Of Mind, Endless shows Murano Glass sculpture – Eu De Rodent in collaboration with Berengo Studio and Cris Contini Contemporary, Fondazione Berengo Art Space, Murano, Venice
- June 2022 - Karl Lagerfeld X Endless, NFT launch, Volume 2, Endless creates live performance artwork in the Karl Lagerfeld Paris headquarters to launch the 2nd volume collaborative NFT, 21 Rue Saint Guillaume, Paris, France
- Oct 2022 - Endless x Jones Road Beauty - Endless creates live window display at Liberty London for Jones Road Beauty launch, London, UK
- Oct 2022 - Endless x Porsche, Live Art Performance, Porsche Centre Reading, UK
- Dec 2022 – Feb 2023 – ENDLESS TREVISO, Endless's first museum exhibition - Musei Civici Treviso, Casa Robegan Museum, Treviso, Italy
- May 2023 – Endless The Icons In Milan, Il Salotto di Milano, Milan, Italy
- June - July 2023 – ENDLESS PALERMO, Museum exhibition at Cantieri Culturali alla Zisa, curated by Miliza Rodic and Prof. Pasquale Lettieri, Palermo, Sicily
