= Forever (Ute Lemper album) =

Studio album by Ute Lemper
- Released: 2014
- Genre: Classical, Pop, Chanson
- Label: Steinway & Sons

Ute Lemper chronology
Paris Days, Berlin Nights (2012)	Forever (2014)

Forever : The Love Poems of Pablo Neruda is a 2014 album by Ute Lemper on the Steinway & Sons label. The album consists of new settings of the poems of Pablo Neruda, in Spanish, with three English and one French translation, by Ute Lemper and Marcelo Nisinman. The arrangements are performed by Ute Lemper’s regular cabaret band with the addition of charango player Freddy Torrealba.

== Track listing ==
1. "La nuit dans l'ile"
2. "Madrigal Escrito en Invierno"
3. "If You Forget Me"
4. "Tus Manos"
5. "El Viento en la Isla"
6. "Alianza / Sonata"
7. "Siempre"
8. "Always"
9. "Ausencia"
10. "El Sueno"
11. "Oda con un Lamento"
12. "The Saddest Poem / No. 20"
