= When the World is Wide =

Studio album by Ykiki Beat
- Released: July 22, 2015
- Genre: Indie rock, pop rock, dream pop, synth pop
- Label: P-Vine Records
- Producer: Ykiki Beat

Ykiki Beat chronology
Tired of Dreams (2014)	When the World is Wide (2015)

Singles from When the World is Wide
- 1. "Forever" Released: September 3, 2014; 2. "Forever" Released: May 18, 2016 (re-release)

When the World is Wide is the debut studio album by Japanese indie rock band Ykiki Beat. It was released on July 22, 2015 by P-Vine Records.

== Track listing ==
No.	Title	Writer(s)	Length
1.	"The Running"	Nobuki Akiyama	3:05
2.	"Modern Lies"	Akiyama	3:05
3.	"Never Let You Go"	Akiyama	3:30
4.	"Dances"	Akiyama	3:12
5.	"Forever"	Akiyama, Kohei Kamoto	4:18
6.	"All The Words To Say"	Akiyama	4:41
7.	"Winter"	Akiyama	4:31
8.	"Vogues of Vision"	Akiyama	4:24

== Personnel ==
Ykiki Beat

- Nobuki Akiyama – lead vocals, guitar
- Kohei Kamoto - guitar
- Koki Nozue - synthesizer
- Yotaro Kachi - bass
- Mizuki Sekiguchi - drums

Additional personal

- Yujiro Yonetsu - production
- Tom McFall - mixing
- Yoshirotten - artworks
- Yu Nakazato - A&R
- Takuya Yamaguchi - management
- Hiroki Sakida - management

== Charts ==
=== Weekly chart ===
Chart (2015)	Peak position
Japanese Albums (Billboard)	56
Japanese Physical Albums (Oricon)	58

== Release history ==
Region	Date	Format	Label	Catalogue	Ref.
Japan	July 22, 2015	CD; digital download	P-Vine Records	PCD-93934	
Japan	April 20, 2016	vinyl	P-Vine Records	PLP-6872	
