= Forever: An Anthology =

Compilation album by Judy Collins
- Released: 1997
- Length: 2:20:41
- Label: Elektra

Judy Collins chronology
Christmas at the Biltmore Estate (1997)	Forever: An Anthology (1997)	Both Sides Now (1998)

Professional ratings
Review scores
Source	Rating
The Encyclopedia of Popular Music	4/5 stars

Forever: An Anthology is a 1997 Judy Collins two-CD compilation album with thirty-five songs, including three new recordings: "The Fallow Way", "Nothing Lasts Forever" and "Walls (We Are Not Forgotten)" and a re-recording of "Chelsea Morning".

== Track listing ==
=== CD #1 ===
Track	Song title	Length	Composer(s)
1	Someday Soon	3:44	Ian Tyson
2	Who Knows Where the Time Goes?	4:43	Sandy Denny
3	Chelsea Morning	3:15	Joni Mitchell
4	Suzanne	4:24	Leonard Cohen
5	Born to the Breed	4:49	Judy Collins
6	Maid of Constant Sorrow	2:37	Traditional
7	Since You Asked	2:35	Judy Collins
8	Bread and Roses	3:06	Mimi Fariña, James Oppenheim
9	In the Hills of Shiloh	3:40	James Friedman, Shel Silverstein
10	City of New Orleans	4:10	Steve Goodman
11	The Fallow Way	4:02	Judy Collins
12	Grandaddy	3:24	Judy Collins
13	My Father	5:04	Judy Collins
14	La Chanson des Vieux Amants	4:39	Jacques Brel
15	In My Life	2:57	Lennon–McCartney
16	Marat Sade	5:37	Richard Peaslee
17	Send in the Clowns	4:04	Stephen Sondheim

=== CD #2 ===
Track	Song title	Length	Composer(s)
1	Both Sides Now	3:15	Joni Mitchell
2	Desperado	3:33	Glenn Frey, Don Henley
3	Masters of War	3:24	Bob Dylan
4	Fisherman Song	3:57	Judy Collins
5	So Early, Early in the Spring	3:10	Traditional
6	First Boy I Loved	7:29	Robin Williamson
7	Albatross	4:52	Judy Collins
8	Hard Lovin' Loser	2:29	Mimi Fariña,
9	In the Heat of the Summer	3:26	Phil Ochs
10	Pirate Jenny	4:04	Marc Blitzstein, Bertolt Brecht, Kurt Weill
11	Turn! Turn! Turn! (To Everything There Is a Season)	3:40	Pete Seeger, Traditional
12	Salt of the Earth	4:01	Jagger/Richards
13	Farewell to Tarwathie	4:53	Traditional, arranged Judy Collins
14	Spanish Is the Loving Tongue	4:32	Charles Bafger Clark Jr.
15	Nothing Lasts Forever	4:31	Judy Collins, Jessie Valenzuela
16	Walls (We Are Not Forgotten)	3:50	Judy Collins, Louis Nelson
17	Bird on a Wire	4:39	Leonard Cohen
18	Amazing Grace	4:06	John Newton
