= Acer Ferrari =

Series of Acer / Ferrari branded device models

Acer Ferrari is a subbrand of Acer Inc. formed through a sponsorship agreement with Scuderia Ferrari signed in 2003. The brand encompasses a number of product series, including notebooks, netbooks and a smartphone.

== Acer Ferrari series ==
- Acer Ferrari 200
- Acer Ferrari 3000
- Acer Ferrari 3200
- Acer Ferrari 3400
- Acer Ferrari 4000
- Acer Ferrari 4005LMi
- Acer Ferrari 4006LMi
- Acer Ferrari 5000
- Acer Ferrari 5005LMi
- Acer Ferrari 1000
- Acer Ferrari 1100
- Acer Ferrari 1200
- Acer Ferrari One
- Acer Liquid E Ferrari
- Acer Liquid Mini Ferrari
- Acer Ferrari LCD Monitor Series (F-17, F-19, F-20)

=== Acer Ferrari One ===
Acer Ferrari One (also known as the Acer FO200) is an ultraportable design with an 11.6" display, a dual-core AMD Athlon processor and Dolby Home Theater audio.

=== Acer Liquid E Ferrari ===
In June 2010 Acer Inc. launched a special edition Ferrari smartphone. Acer Liquid E Ferrari has a 3.5 inch touchscreen and runs Android operating system.
