= Digiday =

Online trade magazine for online media

- Available in: English
- Founded: 2008; 18 years ago
- Headquarters: New York City, U.S.
- Key people: Nick Friese (Founder)
- Industry: Media
- Revenue: Undisclosed
- Employees: 75
- Website: digiday.com
- Registration: Optional
- Current status: Active

Digiday is an online trade magazine for online media founded in 2008 by Nick Friese. It is headquartered in New York City, with offices in London and Tokyo.

== Description ==
Digiday provides daily online news about advertising, publishing, and media, and also produces events such as industry summits and awards galas. Founder Nick Friese created the publication in April 2008. With support from Doug Carlson, managing director of Zinio, Friese put together a Digital Publishing and Advertising Conference in a New York City hotel. Originally called DM2 Events (an abbreviation of Digital Media and Marketing Events), a colleague came up with "Digiday" as a shorter version of Friese's proposed "Digital-Day". The company depends on a variety of offerings to generate revenue, claiming that half of its revenue comes from advertising, branded content, sponsored content, and career listings, and the other half coming from hosting events and conducting awards programs. It further claims that these sources have provided "double-digit revenue growth" in the mid-to-late 2010s. Digiday also has a podcast series covering client, agency, and media perspectives.

Fortune magazine wrote of Digiday, "[y]ou might not have heard of an online publication called Digiday—unless you spend all of your time reading about the media industry, and specifically the marketing side of the digital media industry, in which case you probably read it all the time". Bloomberg View describes Digiday's "running series on 'confessions' from digital marketing insiders" as "a good source of frank and cynical, though anonymous, descriptions of a deeply dysfunctional business", for example, interviewing "a female ex-creative agency executive who talks about the diversity issues that still plague the industry". In February 2015, Fast Company named Digiday on its list of "The World’s Top 10 Most Innovative Companies of 2015 In Media", describing the company as "an important resource and authority in the world of digital media", and citing its "summits on the future of digital advertising". From 2008 to 2017, Digiday hosted over 250 events, such as the annual Digiday Mobile conference held in New York City. Digiday also has a podcast series covering client, agency, and media perspectives. In 2018, Digiday provoked controversy with an article titled "Why agencies are skipping SXSW this year", which was criticized by local business figures as underestimating the relevance of the SXSW festival.

== Other projects ==
In 2014, Digiday created "What the Fuck is my Twitter Bio?", a site that generates random absurd Twitter bios followed by profanity-laced commentary, as a way to mock the tendency of Twitter users to employ certain kinds of self-promotional phrases.

In May 2016, Digiday launched a new website named Glossy, helmed by Digiday staff and intended to provide coverage of fashion and luxury brands, and the impact of technology on these areas, similar to the coverage of media sites provided by Digiday. Friese stated that he "plans to take the same approach to Glossy as it took with Digiday", beginning with news reporting and eventually expanding to conferences and other events to drive revenue.

== Personnel ==
Since October 2020, Jim Cooper, former editorial director of Adweek, has been editor in chief of Digiday. He succeeded Brian Morrissey, who joined Digiday from Adweek in 2011. Josh Sternberg was a senior editor from January 2012 to July 2014, when he left Digiday for a position with The Washington Post. In October 2013, Digiday hired HBO marketing manager Emily Wilcox as its first marketing director. In September 2015, Digiday hired Paul Kontonis, formerly senior VP of strategy for Collective Digital Studio, and president of the Global Online Video Association, as its new chief marketing officer and chief communications officer. In September 2020, founding editor-in-chief Brian Morrissey announced his departure from the company.
