= Eternalism =

Eternalism may refer to:

- Eternalism (philosophy of time), the view that all of time is equally real
- Eternity of the world, the view that the past is infinite
- Sassatavada, an ontological view rejected by Buddhism
- Eternalism, an album by The Panic Division

== See also ==
- Eternity
