= Glen Meakem =

American businessman and radio host

- Born: New York, New York
- Education: Harvard University; Harvard Business School
- Occupation: Entrepreneur
- Political party: Republican
- Spouse: Diane Meakem

Glen Meakem (born in New York, New York) is an American entrepreneur and founder & CEO of a permanent cloud photo storage and sharing company called Forever. He is also a former radio host based in Pittsburgh, Pennsylvania.

== Early life and education ==
Meakem was the second of five children, raised in Armonk, New York. He graduated cum laude with an A.B. from Harvard University in 1986. He served as a combat engineer officer in the United States Army Reserve. In 1990-1991, he volunteered to return to active duty in the Army, took a leave of absence from Harvard Business School, and served as a platoon leader in Saudi Arabia and Kuwait during the First Gulf War. After the war, Meakem returned to Harvard Business School and completed his M.B.A. in 1992.

== Career ==
Meakem worked for General Electric, but left in 1995 to start his own company, FreeMarkets Inc., a software company that offers services to the Global Supply Management market. He sold the company for $500 million.

Between 2005 and 2012, Meakem founded and led an early-stage venture capital firm called Meakem Becker Venture Capital (MBVC). MBVC invested in a number of technology companies, including Kiva Systems (sold to Amazon), HotPads (sold to Zillow), Shipwire (sold to Ingram Micro), and CloudMeter (sold to Splunk).

He sat on the board of directors of Akustica, and is Chairman of the Board of both SEEC and Niche. He is a trustee for Carnegie Mellon University, Grove City College, Pittsburgh Cultural Trust, the Urban League of Pittsburgh and the Extra Mile Education Foundation.

From March 2008 until June 2015, he hosted Glen Meakem on the Weekend, a talk radio program about what it takes to be successful in business and life; the program aired initially on WPGB 104.7 until the station flipped formats to country music in August 2014, when it moved to WJAS 1320. He gave up the program to spend more time with his family and on another business he started, a cloud-storage host, Forever.com.

== Politics ==
Meakem served as campaign chairman for William Scranton, III, the former Lieutenant Governor of Pennsylvania, during the 2006 campaign for the Republican nomination for Governor.

He reportedly considered involving himself in a primary challenge to incumbent Republican Senator Arlen Specter in 2010, due to opposition to Specter's support of the federal stimulus package. He was mentioned by the Pittsburgh Post-Gazette and the National Journal as a possible candidate for the Republican nomination for U.S. Senate to challenge incumbent Democrat Bob Casey Jr. in the 2012 election.

In 2010, Politics Magazine named him one of the most influential Republicans in Pennsylvania.
