= The Tech Report =

Technology news website

- Website type: Technology website
- Available in: English
- Owner: Unknown
- Creators: Scott Wasson and Andy Brown
- Website: techreport.com
- Commercial: Yes
- Registration: None
- Launched: 1999; 27 years ago
- Current status: Dormant

The Tech Report, often shortened to "TR", was a technology news and hardware review site that was established in 1999 with the first article being published on October 30, 1999.

From 1999 through mid-2019 the site hosted an active community forum, published system build guides and eventually added a podcast. Some of the site's investigative articles regarding hardware benchmarking were cited by other reputable technology news sites like Anandtech and PC World.

The site went through an ownership change and major redesign in the middle of 2019, moving to be more of a general technology news site, resulting in the elimination of the podcast, system build guides and eventually the forums. The new ownership also began republishing historical reviews originally written prior to the sale. The only changes were new publication dates.

The site appears to have been sold again in 2025 to unknown owners and as of June 22, 2026 appears to be dormant, with the last content being published on March 27, 2026.

== History ==
The Tech Report was founded by Scott Wasson, and Andy 'Dr. Evil' Brown. Both started writing at Ars Technica in 1998. The site eventually grew into a business enterprise with multiple full-time staff members.

On December 2, 2015, Scott Wasson, the remaining founder and Editor-In-Chief stepped down as he accepted a role in AMD's graphics division. Wasson subsequently sold the company in March 2018 to Adam Eiberger, the site's business manager.

On December 21, 2018 Jeff Kampman stepped down as Editor-In-Chief and was replaced by Seth Colaner as the interim Managing Editor. The site was subsequently sold to investors John Rampton and John Rall, and Renee Johnson took over as Editor-in-Chief. When Renee Johnson assumed the Editor-in-Chief position in 2019, all articles written by Jeff Kampman dating back to 2014 had his byline removed and replaced with Renee's. This situation continues to exist as of 2026. Other writers such as Scott Wasson have had their articles republished with revised datelines that make it appear as if an old article was only recently published and that the author was still writing for the site. This practice includes notable articles such as the "Inside the Second" article from 2011 which was republished with a December 2024 dateline.

On July 7, 2019, coinciding with the release of AMD's Ryzen 3 CPUs and Navi GPUs, a site redesign was launched, moving from The Tech Report's former custom CMS and functionality to a WordPress template. On July 9, Johnson posted an introduction to the design. The new redesign was met with criticism from the users. In August of the same year, TechReport's senior editing team experienced a series of changes, which was also evident in a change in direction in terms of the focus of the site, no longer publishing hardware reviews or creating system guides.

By July 2025, Renee Johnson left The Tech Report and the site appeared to have been sold again, moving from being a Missouri corporation to unknown owners.

== AMD TLB bug investigation ==
In 2007, The Tech Report was one of the first sites to document and benchmark the flaw in the translation lookaside buffer (TLB) of AMD Phenom CPUs. AMD initially claimed that the BIOS patch needed to address this issue would result in only a 10% performance decrease. Subsequent benchmark tests conducted by The Tech Report revealed that the performance impact from the patch was significantly larger, up to nearly 20% on average, with some applications such as Firefox experiencing a performance hit of 57%. The Tech Report also broke the news that AMD had stopped shipping affected processors.

== Video game and GPU performance benchmarking research ==
On September 8, 2011, Scott Wasson posted an article titled "Inside the Second: A New Look at Game Benchmarking." This article demonstrated that frames per second (FPS) are not the only factor that matters in "smooth" gameplay, with frame latency also having a large impact. This innovative benchmarking method was later mentioned and acknowledged by other publications such as Anandtech, which described this method as "a revolution in the 3D game benchmarking scene" and with Overclockers noting how The Tech Report pioneered measure frame timing.

== SSD endurance experiment ==
In 2013, The Tech Report started an experiment using several SSD drives to determine how many writes they can endure. This test lasted for more than 18 months before all drives used in this test failed, enduring much larger amount of written data than rated by manufacturers themselves, and even prompting one of the manufacturers, Samsung, to release a humorous music video dedicated to this test.

== Historical site structure ==
=== Homepage ===
A large portion of the main page was dedicated to "News" and "Blog" entries. Among the news entries were "Shortbread" posts which offered a summary breakdown of reviews and news offered by other sites. Featured articles were often reviews of newly released PC hardware that had been tested by the site's editors and judged on several metrics including performance and value compared to other available hardware.

=== Podcast ===
Adapting to the general trend of more content for digest, The Tech Report launched its podcast on February 9, 2008, hosted by Jordan Drake. While the schedule varied it provided a casual yet in-depth look back at the topics that made news from a panel of the site staff. After 2015 episodes were released irregularly, frequently discussing the release of a new microarchitecture with David Kanter of Real World Technologies. The last episode was made in January 2018.

This podcast should not be confused with the unrelated podcast from Times Radio, also titled "The Tech Report", started circa July 2025.

=== Community and forum ===
Until 2024 The Tech Report had a phpBB-styled forum that was unrestricted in read-only form and open to the public for contribution via simple registration. The forum was primarily structured around computer technology and related topics, but debates also ranged from politics and religion in the "opt-in only" R&P forum to general random chatter in the Back Porch. Financial supporters of the website also had access to a restricted forum called the Smoky Back Room. Registered users had the ability to respond to news topics and other entries posted on the front page in an isolated threaded comments section that automatically attached to each new entry. Although access to the main page comments was linked to the user database, the discussions were logged separately from the forum area of the site and not counted toward the user forum statistics.
