= Endless.com =

American e-commerce website

- Type: Subsidiary
- Industry: Retail
- Founded: 2007
- Products: Shoes, handbags and accessories
- Owner: Amazon
- Website: www.endless.com

Endless.com was an American e-commerce site owned by Amazon that sold shoes and accessories. Amazon closed Endless.com on September 27, 2012, and directed its customers to Amazon.com/Fashion.

== Overview ==
Endless.com was created in December 2007 by Amazon, as their first separate e-commerce brand. Launched sites in Japan, the UK, France and Germany mirroring Endless.com's business under the name Javari.

It was announced on July 22, 2009, that Amazon would buy online shoe retailer Zappos for $940 million in a stock and cash deal.
